The following is a list of films released posthumously involving major cast or crew members who either died during production or before the film's release.

Directors
 All of Louis Le Prince's surviving films, following his mysterious disappearance in 1890.
 The Song of Songs (1918), released just seventeen days after Joseph Kaufman's death in the 1918 flu pandemic.
 The Top of New York (1922), released four months after William Desmond Taylor's unsolved murder.
 Such Men Are Dangerous (1930), released just over two months after Kenneth Hawks' death in a two-plane crash over the Pacific Ocean, while directing re-takes of aerial scenes for the film; Hawks, the younger brother of fellow director Howard Hawks, was killed along with pilot Walter Ross Cook, cameraman George Eastman, assistant director Ben Frankel, assistant director Max Gold, Tom Harris, Harry Johannes, Otho Jordan, pilot Halleck Rouse, and cinematographer Conrad Wells (also known as Abraham Fried). The finished film left Hawks uncredited.
 The Sin Ship (1931), released two months after Louis Wolheim's death from stomach cancer.
 Tabu (1931), released a week after F.W. Murnau's death in a car accident.
 The Viking (1931), given its public release over three months after co-director Varick Frissell's death in an explosion, along with 26 other crew members, on board the SS Viking; the film, shot on location in Newfoundland by George Melford and Frissell in the winter of 1930–31, had been nominally completed and privately screened when Frissell decided it needed more sensational and realistic footage from the Labrador ice floes. On March 15, 1931, a cache of dynamite loaded on the vessel, being used for Frissell's film to add to the sensationalism of giant explosions of icebergs, spontaneously blew up, destroying the back of the ship, blowing the stern off the vessel, and causing the Viking to catch fire and sink, killing 27 members of the crew who were filming an iceberg, including Frissell and cinematographer Alexander Gustavus Penrod. The film as Frissell had left it was prepared for its posthumous release by associate producer Roy W. Gates. A French-language version of the film, Ceux du "Viking", shot simultaneously with the English-language version by French director René Ginet and also featuring Frissell's nature footage, was released in February 1932, 11 months after Frissell's death.
 The Case of the Black Cat (1936), released four months after Alan Crosland's death in a car accident.
 The Last of Mrs. Cheyney (1937), released over a month after Richard Boleslawski's death from cardiac arrest.
 Titanic (1943), released a year after Herbert Selpin's supposed suicide. The film was completed by Werner Klingler who was not credited.
 That Lady in Ermine (1948), released over eight months after Ernst Lubitsch's death from a heart attack.
 Ambush (1950), released four months after Sam Wood's death from a heart attack.
 Fort Worth (1951), released two months after Edwin L. Marin's death.
 The Lovers of Montparnasse (1958), released over a year after Max Ophüls' death from rheumatic heart disease, while shooting interiors on the film. Because he died in the middle of production, Ophüls' friend Jacques Becker took over after the director's death and finished the picture; it was dedicated to Ophüls' memory.
 The Fly (1958), Machete (1958), Watusi (1959), and Counterplot (1959) all released after Kurt Neumann's death.
 The Hole (1960), released less than a month after Jacques Becker's sudden death; Becker, who had shot the film over a period of ten weeks, died of an undisclosed illness just two weeks after filming had wrapped. The picture was edited and assembled by Marguerite Renoir and Geneviève Vaury based on notes the director had written before his death; the completed film was nominated for a Palme d'Or at the 13th Cannes Film Festival.
 Song Without End (1960), released a year after Charles Vidor's death from a heart attack. Because Vidor had died in the middle of filming, directing work was completed by George Cukor, who received on-screen credit for providing grateful contributions to the picture.
 A Dandy in Aspic (1968), released a year after Anthony Mann's death from a heart attack.
 The Love God? (1969), released eight months after Nat Hiken's death from a heart attack.
 Blood from the Mummy's Tomb (1971), released eight months after Seth Holt's death
 The Honkers (1972), released five days after Steve Ihnat's death from a heart attack, while attending the 25th Cannes Film Festival.
 Salò, or the 120 Days of Sodom (1976), released twenty days after Pier Paolo Pasolini's murder; the killer ran over him several times with Pasolini's own car while at the Ostia beach, near Rome.
 The Greatest (1977), released four months after co-director Tom Gries' death.
 The Many Adventures of Winnie the Pooh (1977) and The Rescuers (1977), both released over a year after co-director John Lounsbery's death as a result of surgical complications due to heart failure.
 The Lovers' Wind (1978), released nearly eight years after Albert Lamorisse's death in 1970 during shooting on the film, in a helicopter crash over a tour of Iran; his widow and son eventually completed the film, based on his production notes. It was nominated for a posthumous Academy Award for Best Documentary Feature.
 Watership Down (1978), released over a year after John Hubley's death during heart surgery; the film was eventually finished by Martin Rosen, and Hubley went uncredited.
 Avalanche Express (1979), released over a year after Mark Robson's death from a heart attack during filming; production was completed by his friend and fellow director, Monte Hellman, who went uncredited for his work.
 Freedom Road (1979), released nearly five months after Ján Kadár's death.
 Scout's Honor (1980), released four months after Henry Levin's death.
 Lightning Over Water (1980), released over a year after co-director Nicholas Ray's death from lung cancer.
 Querelle (1982), released two months after Rainer Werner Fassbinder's death from heart failure, due to a lethal mixture of sleeping pills and cocaine.
 Steaming (1985), released about a year after Joseph Losey's death.
 The Dead (1987), released almost four months after John Huston's death from emphysema and complications from a heart attack.
 Welcome Home (1989), released nearly three months after Franklin J. Schaffner's death from lung cancer.
 The Nutcracker (1993) and Gypsy (1993), released four days and less than a month, respectively, after Emile Ardolino's death due to complications from AIDS.
 Blue Sky (1994), released nearly three years after Tony Richardson's death from complications from AIDS.
 Be a Wicked Woman (1990), shelved by director Kim Ki-young and screened publicly in 1998, following his death that same year in a house fire.
 The Argument (1998) and Wild Side (1999), both released over two years after Donald Cammell's suicide, following a disastrous recut of Wild Side by the film's producer.
 Eyes Wide Shut (1999), released over four months after filmmaker Stanley Kubrick's death from a heart attack.
 A Decade Under the Influence (2003), released a year after Ted Demme's death from a heart attack.
 06/05 (2004), released one month after Theo van Gogh's assassination.
 Quiet Flows the Don (2006), released over twelve years after Sergei Bondarchuk's death from a heart attack; disputes after filming had wrapped in 1994, over unfavorable clauses in Bondarchuk's contract with the Italian studio co-producing the film, left the tapes locked in a bank vault until sometime after the director's death. Bondarchuk's son, Fyodor Bondarchuk, assembled and edited the film for its final release on Russian television in 2006.
 Everyone's Hero (2006), released after co-director Christopher Reeve's death in 2004.
 Cars (2006), released after co-director Joe Ranft's death from a car crash.
 California Dreamin' (2007), released nearly nine months after Cristian Nemescu's death in a taxi accident; the crash also killed the film's sound designer, Andrei Toncu.
 Waitress (2007), released just over six months after Adrienne Shelly's murder at the hands of Diego Pillco; the Ecuadorian immigrant was caught stealing money from Shelly and decided to strangle her to death with a bedsheet, then frame it as a suicide by hanging.
 The No. 1 Ladies' Detective Agency (2008), television film pilot, aired five days after Anthony Minghella's death from a cancer-related hemorrhage.
 Dhaam Dhoom (2008), a Tamil (Indian language) film co-written and partly directed by Jeeva shortly before his death; it was completed by his widow, Anees Murugaraj, and his longtime assistant, V. Manikandan, and overseen by veteran cinematographer P. C. Sriram.
 Buy a Suit (2008), released just over a month after Jun Ichikawa's death from a cerebral hemorrhage, following his collapse at a restaurant.
 Casino Jack (2010), released just over a month after George Hickenlooper's death from an accidental overdose of oxymorphone and alcohol.
 Jab Tak Hai Jaan (2012), released just over a month after Yash Chopra's death from dengue fever and multiple organ failure.
 Hard to Be a God (2013), released nearly nine months after Aleksei Yuryevich German's sudden death; the film itself had been shot from 2000 to 2006, and was in the midst of intensive sound editing upon German's death.
 The Uncondemned (2015), released just over two weeks after co-director Nick Louvel's death in a traffic collision.
 Traffic (2016), released just over a month after Rajesh Pillai's death from non-alcoholic liver cirrhosis.
 The Aquatic Effect (2016), released nearly ten months after Sólveig Anspach's death from breast cancer.
 Odd Job (2016), released almost a year after Pascal Chaumeil's death from cancer.
 The Evil Within (2017), released nearly two years after Andrew Getty's death.
 24 Frames (2017), released under a year after Abbas Kiarostami's death.
 The Other Side of the Wind (2018), released 33 years after Orson Welles' death.
Varda par Agnes (2019), released after Agnès Varda's death, though it had premiered at the Berlin Film Festival a month prior.
 The Amusement Park (2019), released in Pittsburgh two years after George A. Romero's death.
 Raging Fire (2021), released a year after Benny Chan's death from nasopharyngeal cancer.
 laabam (2021), released just over six months after S.P. Jananathan's death.

Screenwriters

 A Perfect Gentleman (1928), released just four days after Charles T. Horan's death from a heart attack.
 King Kong (1933), released a year after Edgar Wallace's death due to complications from diabetes.
 Gone with the Wind (1939), released nearly four months after Sidney Howard's death in a tractor accident; he had turned the ignition switch on and was cranking the engine to start it when it lurched forward, pinning him against the wall of his garage and crushing him to death. He won the 1939 Academy Award for Writing Adapted Screenplay for Gone with the Wind, the first time a posthumous nominee for any Oscar won the award.
 The Shepherd of the Hills (1941), released nearly eight months after Grover Jones's death.
 The Night of the Hunter (1955), released four months after James Agee's death from a heart attack.
 The Spy Who Came in from the Cold (1965), released two years after Guy Trosper's death from a heart attack.
 The Legend of Lylah Clare (1968), released seven months after co-writer Hugo Butler's death from a heart attack.
 The Buddy Holly Story (1978), released two days after Robert Gittler's suicide.
 Arabian Adventure (1979), released almost nine months after Brian Hayles' death at the age of 48.
 The Empire Strikes Back (1980), released over two years after Leigh Brackett's death from cancer.
Roar (1981), released two years after Ted Cassidy's death following complications from heart surgery.
 Daffy Duck's Fantastic Island (1983), released seven months after John Dunn's death.
 Brotherly Love (1985), released a year after Ernest Tidyman's death.
 The Glass Menagerie (1987), released four years after Tennessee Williams' choking death.
 Mr. North (1988), released a year after John Huston's death.
 Kansas (1988), War Party (1988) and Night Game (1989), all released following Spencer Eastman's death from lung cancer.
 See No Evil, Hear No Evil (1989), released three years after Arne Sultan's death from cancer.
 Always (1989), released over four years after Diane Thomas' death in a car accident; Jerry Belson completed the script after her death.
 Malcolm X (1992), released 21 years after Arnold Perl's death.
 The Grass Harp (1996), released six months after Stirling Silliphant's death.
 Murder at 1600 (1997), released two years after David Hodgin's death.
 She's So Lovely (1997), released eight years after the death of John Cassavetes who wrote the script in 1987.
 I Woke Up Early The Day I Died (1998), released twenty years after Edward D. Wood, Jr.'s death from a heart attack.
 After the Rain (1999), released exactly a year after Akira Kurosawa's death from a stroke.
 The Flintstones in Viva Rock Vegas (2000) and Anacondas: The Hunt for the Blood Orchid (2004), both released after Jim Cash's death.
 One Night at McCool's (2001), released over nine months after Stan Seidel's death from Crohn's disease.
 Heaven (2002), Hell (2005), and Purgatory (2007), all following the death of Krzysztof Kieślowski in 1996.
 The Singing Detective (2003), released nine years after Dennis Potter's death.
The Lost City (2005), released seven months after Guillermo Cabrera Infante's death from sepsis.
 Cars (2006) and Mater and the Ghostlight (2006; short film), both released a year after Joe Ranft's death.
 The Contract (2006), released a year after Stephen Katz's death from prostate cancer.
 The Man from Earth (2007), released nine years after Jerome Bixby's death from heart failure.
 Serious Moonlight (2009), released over three years after Adrienne Shelly's murder.
 Nine (2009), released over a year after co-writer Anthony Minghella's death. In addition, Minghella also wrote a segment in New York, I Love You (2008).
 Main Street (2010), released a year after Horton Foote's death.
 Justice League: Doom (2012; direct-to-video), released a year after Dwayne McDuffie's death. 
 Tom and Jerry: Robin Hood and His Merry Mouse (2012; direct-to-video), released a year after Earl Kress' death.
 Thor: The Dark World (2013), released seven months after writer Don Payne's death.
 Rio 2 (2014), following Don Rhymer's death from complications of head and neck cancer.
 The BFG (2016), released seven months after Melissa Mathison's death.
 Fences (2016), released eleven years after August Wilson's death. 
 The Other Side of the Wind (2018), released 33 years after Orson Welles' death.
 Mewtwo Strikes Back: Evolution (2019), released in Japan nine years after Takeshi Shudo's death.
 Devil's Revenge (2019), released four years after Maurice Hurley's death.
 The Boys in the Band (2020), released six months after Mart Crowley's death.
 Mank (2020), released seventeen years after Jack Fincher's death.
 Measure for Measure (2020), released two years after Damian Hill's death.
Over the Moon (2020), released two years after Audrey Wells' death.
 Walking with Herb (2021), released two years after Mark Medoff's death.
 The Crusade (2021) and Land of Dreams (2021), released after Jean-Claude Carrière's death.

Producers
 Zudora (1914–1915), a 20-part serial whose first installment was released just over three months after producer Charles J. Hite's death in an automobile accident; Hite was on the way to his home in New Rochelle, New York, and was crossing the viaduct at 155th Street in Manhattan when his vehicle skidded off the roadway and onto the sidewalk, tore through an iron railing and plunged fifty feet before landing atop a wooden fence, with Hite underneath it, having suffered a fractured skull, a compound fracture to his jaw, and three broken ribs. After it took fifteen minutes to pull him from beneath it, Hite was taken to the hospital, where he died that same night. Both the serial's production and the film studio Hite owned, Thanhouser, went into a long, slow decline following his death.
 The Viking (1931), given its public release over three months after producer Varick Frissell's death in an explosion, along with 26 other crew members, on board the SS Viking; the film, shot on location in Newfoundland by co-directors George Melford and Frissell (Melford filming actors, Frissell filming nature) in the winter of 1930–31, had been nominally complete when Frissell screened it privately at the Nickel Theatre at St. John's on March 5, 1931, but the producer came away feeling it needed more sensational and realistic footage from the Labrador ice floes. On March 15, 1931, while trying to film an iceberg, Frissell, cinematographer Alexander Gustavus Penrod, and 25 other film crew members were killed when a cache of dynamite loaded on the vessel, being used for Frissell's film to add to the sensationalism of giant explosions of icebergs, spontaneously blew up, destroying the back of the ship, blowing the stern off the vessel, and causing the Viking to catch fire and sink. The film that had been screened at the Nickel Theatre was subsequently polished and prepared for release by associate producer Roy W. Gates, who directed a prologue featuring Newfoundland explorer Sir Wilfred Grenfell, who had known and worked with Frissell, lionizing the producer and the men who had died with him. A French-language version of the film, Ceux du "Viking", shot simultaneously with Melford's English-language version by French director René Ginet and also produced by Frissell and featuring his nature footage, was released in February 1932, 11 months after Frissell's death.
 Marie Antoinette (1938), released nearly two years after Irving Thalberg's death from pneumonia.
 The Lamp Still Burns (1943), released over six months after Leslie Howard's death in a plane crash.
 The Naked City (1948), released over two months after producer and narrator Mark Hellinger's death from a sudden heart attack; after Hellinger's death, executives at Universal Studios were ready to scrap the film, as they had no idea how to market it, and feared it would be a box office failure. Hellinger's widow, however, reminded the studio that Hellinger's contract for the film included a "guarantee of release" clause from Universal; having no choice, Universal released the film into theaters, and were subsequently surprised when it became a hit, garnering two Oscars for the studio.
 Apache Drums (1951), released less than a month after producer Val Lewton's death from two massive heart attacks, at Cedars-Sinai Medical Center.
 Smiley (1956), released over five months after Alexander Korda's death from a heart attack.
 Ben-Hur (1959), released over a year after Sam Zimbalist's death from a heart attack, whilst shooting in Rome.
 Hemingway's Adventures of a Young Man (1962), released two months after Jerry Wald's death.
 Monkeys, Go Home! (1967), The Adventures of Bullwhip Griffin (1967), The Happiest Millionaire (1967), The Gnome-Mobile (1967), The Jungle Book (1967), Charlie, the Lonesome Cougar (1967), and Winnie the Pooh and the Blustery Day (1968), all released after Walt Disney's death from lung cancer.
 Where Were You When the Lights Went Out? (1968) and With Six You Get Eggroll (1968), both released after Martin Melcher's death.
 The Only Game in Town (1970), released two months after Fred Kohlmar's death
 Mr. North (1988), released a year after John Huston's death.
 The Witches (1990), released in the UK nine days after Jim Henson's death.
 Homeward Bound: The Incredible Journey (1993), released just one year following the death of co-producer Franklin R. Levy.
 The Rock (1996), released five months after Don Simpson's death.
 Fallen (1998), and City of Angels (1998), both released after Dawn Steel's death.
 The City of Lost Souls (2000), Spirited Away (2001) and Koro's Big Walk (2002), all released in Japan after the death of chief executive producer Yasuyoshi Tokuma.
Scooby-Doo and the Cyber Chase (2001; direct-to-video), Tom and Jerry: The Magic Ring (2002; direct-to-video), and Scooby-Doo (2002), all released after William Hanna's death from throat infection caused by esophageal tumor
 The Room (2003), which started production well after Drew Caffrey's death in 1999.
Corpse Bride (2005), released a month after Joe Ranft's death from a car crash.
 The Fog (2005) and World Trade Center (2006), both released after the death of producer Debra Hill.
 The Santa Clause 3: The Escape Clause (2006), Phat Girlz (2006) and Breach (2007), all released after the death of Robert Newmyer.
Chill Out, Scooby-Doo! (2007; direct-to-video) and Tom and Jerry: A Nutcracker Tale (2007; direct-to-video), both released after Joseph Barbera's death from natural causes.
 Stone of Destiny (2008), Edison and Leo (2008), The Imaginarium of Doctor Parnassus (2009) and Push (2009) all released after the death of William Vince from cancer. Vince served as executive producer of the former two films and producer of the latter two.
 The Reader (2008) and Margaret (2011), released after Anthony Minghella's death from a cancer-related hemorrhage and Sydney Pollack's death from cancer.
 21 Jump Street (2012) and 22 Jump Street (2014), both released after Stephen J. Cannell's death from complications from melanoma.
 The Amazing Spider-Man (2012) and The Butler (2013), released after Laura Ziskin's death from breast cancer.
 Stoker (2013), released after Tony Scott's suicide.
 The Girl in the Photographs (2015) released a month after Wes Craven's death from brain cancer.
 Bessie (2015) and Hidden (2015), both to be released three years after Richard D. Zanuck's death from heart attack.
 Creed (2015), released months after Robert Chartoff's death from pancreatic cancer. While not producing The second film after his death. Warner Bros. and MGM announced that Chartoff would not produce Creed 2, after his death from pancreatic cancer, while William Chartoff (his son) produced Creed 2 instead.
 God's Not Dead 2 (2016), released a year after Russell Wolfe's death from ALS.
 The Legend of Tarzan (2016), released a year after Jerry Weintraub's death.
 Rock Dog (2017) released after David B. Miller's death.
 Solo: A Star Wars Story (2018), The One and Only Ivan (2020) and Chaos Walking (2021), all released after Allison Shearmur's death.
 Batman Ninja (2018) and Teen Titans Go! To the Movies (2018) released a few months after Benjamin Melniker's death.
 The Other Side of the Wind (2018), released 33 years after Orson Welles' death.
 Spider-Man: Into the Spider-Verse (2018), Captain Marvel (2019), Avengers: Endgame (2019), Dark Phoenix (2019), Spider-Man: Far From Home (2019), The New Mutants (2020) and Black Widow (2021) all released after Stan Lee's death. Lee served as executive producer for these films. The latter delayed its original 2020 release due to the COVID-19 pandemic.
 Measure for Measure (2020), released two months after Damian Hill's death.
 Mulan (2020), released three years after J. C. Spink's death.
The SpongeBob Movie: Sponge on the Run (2021), released three years after Stephen Hillenburg's death from ALS. 
Walking with Herb (2021), released two years after Mark Medoff's death. 
A Babysitter's Guide to Monster Hunting (2020), Godmothered (2020) and Ghostbusters: Afterlife (2021), all released after Tom Pollock's death.
Paper Spiders (2020), Chick Fight (2020), Down South (2021), The Sixth Reel (2021) and As They Made Us (2022) all released after Ash Christian's death.
Dungeons & Dragons: Honor Among Thieves (2023) and Transformers: Rise of the Beasts (2023) both to be released two years after Brian Goldner's death.

Composers and lyricists
 Bambi (1942), Saludos Amigos (1942), The Adventures of Ichabod and Mr. Toad (1949), and Peter Pan (1953), all released after Frank Churchill's death from suicide.
 Omar Khayyam (1956), released over eight months after Victor Young's death.
 The Jet Cage (1962), released five months after Milt Franklyn's death.
 The Incredible Journey (1963), following Oliver Wallace's death.
 Airport (1970), released less than a month after Alfred Newman's death.
 Taxi Driver (1976) and Obsession (1976), both released after Bernard Herrmann's death in December 1975.
 Funeral Home (1980), released eight months after Jerry Fielding's death from a heart attack.
 Beauty and the Beast (1991), Aladdin (1992), The Return of Jafar (1994; direct-to-video), Aladdin and the King of Thieves (1996; direct-to-video), Beauty and the Beast: The Enchanted Christmas (1997; direct-to-video), Belle's Magical World (1998; direct-to-video), The Little Mermaid II: Return to the Sea (2000; direct-to-video), The Little Mermaid: Ariel's Beginning (2008; direct-to-video), Beauty and the Beast (2017), Howard (2018), Aladdin (2019), and The Little Mermaid (2023), all released after Howard Ashman's death.
 Man Trouble (1992) and Rich in Love (1993), both following Georges Delerue's death
 Larger Than Life (1996) and 'Til There Was You (1997), both following Miles Goodman's death.
 Against the Ropes (2004) and First Daughter (2004) both released a year after Michael Kamen's death.
 Vadakkumnathan (2006) and Kalabham (2006) both released a year after Raveendran's death.
 Black Christmas (2006), released one month after Shirley Walker's death from a stroke.
 Behind the Candelabra (2013), released nine months after Marvin Hamlisch's death.
 The 33 (2015), Southpaw (2015) and The Magnificent Seven (2016) all released after James Horner's death from a plane crash.
 Mary Magdalene (2018) released a few weeks after Jóhann Jóhannsson's death.
 West Side Story (2021) and Merrily We Roll Along (TBA) both released after Stephen Sondheim's death.

Actors and actresses

In several cases, actors or actresses have died prior to the release of a film: either during filming or after it has been completed, but is yet to be released. In the case that the actor dies during filming, their scenes are often completed by stunt doubles, or through special effects. Only people who actually appear in some capacity in a posthumously released film are listed here. Those who were scheduled to start a project, but died before filming began, are not included.

1910s
 A Dash Through the Clouds (1912), released just twenty-three days after aviator and actor Philip Orin Parmelee's death in a plane crash; he was piloting an airplane at an air show in Yakima, Washington, on June 1, 1912, at altitudes variously described from 400 to 2,000 feet, when air turbulence flipped over his airplane and caused it to crash, killing him instantly.
 A Woman's Way (1913), In the Haunts of Fear (1913), and The Blight (1913), all released after Joseph Graybill's death at the age of 26—strangely, different records state conflicting information as to the cause of Graybill's death; the Internet Movie Database (IMDb) lists it as acute spinal meningitis, and the first death notice in the New York Times contradicts the death certificate as to the day of death—it lists the cause of death on August 2, not the 3, as a nervous breakdown—but an obituary on August 4 lists the cause as gastritis. Contradicting all of these, a 1913 Motion Picture Story magazine article states that he had a "nervous disorder of the optic nerve and died". Finally, Graybill's death certificate states that the cause of death was acute pachymeningitis and a contributory factor was alcohol poisoning; both the certificate and the first death notice note he entered Bellevue Hospital on July 24.
 Across the Border (1914), released over a month after Grace McHugh's death during filming; while on location on the Arkansas River in Colorado, re-shooting a scene of McHugh fording the river on horseback, her horse lost its footing, and the actress was thrown into the swift current. Cinematographer Owen Carter stopped filming and plunged into the river to save her; together they succeeded in reaching a sandbar, which unfortunately proved to be quicksand, and they both drowned. Shooting of the picture was otherwise complete, and the film was released with the majority of Grace McHugh's work intact.
 The Great Romance (1919), Shadows of Suspicion (1919), and A Man of Honor (1919), all released after Harold Lockwood's death in the 1918 flu pandemic; because he died before filming on Shadows of Suspicion was completed, changes were made to the script, and the film was completed using a double shot from behind to stand in for Lockwood.
 The Lone Star Ranger (1919), Wolves of the Night (1919), The Last of the Duanes (1919), and The Spite Bride (1919), all released after Lamar Johnstone's sudden death at age 34 from heart disease.
 Paid in Advance (1919), released six days after William Stowell's death in a train accident, while scouting locations for Universal in the Belgian Congo.

1920s
 The Skywayman (1920), released just over a month after daredevil stunt flier and actor Ormer Locklear's death on the last day of filming; while shooting the finale by night, Locklear had to dive the plane, carrying himself and co-pilot Milton 'Skeets' Elliott, towards some oil derricks and appear to crash it. He forewarned the lighting crew to douse their lights when he got near the derricks, so that he could see to pull out of the dive; the lights remained full on, blinding him, and he crashed. The finished film showed this crash, and its aftermath, in gruesome detail.
 Everybody's Sweetheart (1920), released less than a month after Olive Thomas' death, at the age of 25; on the night of September 5, 1920, Thomas and her husband, Jack Pickford, went out for a night of entertainment and partying at the famous bistros in the Montparnasse Quarter of Paris. Returning to their room in the Hotel Ritz around 3:00 am, Pickford either fell asleep or was outside the room for a final round of drugs. An intoxicated and tired Thomas accidentally ingested a large dose of a mercury bichloride liquid solution, which had been prescribed for her husband's chronic syphilis. Being liquid, it was supposed to be applied topically, not ingested. She had either thought the flask contained drinking water or sleeping pills; accounts vary. The label was in French, which may have added to the confusion. She screamed, "Oh, my God!", and Pickford ran to pick her up in his arms; however, it was too late, as she had already ingested a lethal dose. She was taken to the American Hospital in the Paris suburb of Neuilly-sur-Seine, where she succumbed to the poison a few days later.
 Coincidence (1921), released a year after Robert Harron's suicide; he fatally shot himself in the left lung with a revolver due to disappointment that director and mentor D.W. Griffith had passed him over for the starring role in Way Down East.
 Foolish Wives (1922), released almost a year after Rudolph Christians' death from pneumonia; the German actor, father of Austrian stage and screen actress Mady Christians, was playing the central part of the cuckolded American envoy in Erich von Stroheim's film. As Christians died in the middle of production, von Stroheim was forced to bring in actor Robert Edeson (back to camera) to finish Christians' scenes.
 Wildness of Youth (1922), released nearly two months after child star Bobby Connelly's death from bronchitis, brought on by a years-long battle with endocarditis and worsened by a heavy work schedule; Connelly was 13 years old. 
 The Warrens of Virginia (1924), almost a year after actress Martha Mansfield's death at the age of 24; on November 30, 1923, while working on the film on location in San Antonio, Texas, Mansfield was severely burned when a match, tossed by a cast member, ignited her Civil War costume of hoopskirts and flimsy ruffles. Mansfield was playing the role of Agatha Warren and had just finished her scenes and retired to a car when her clothing burst into flames. Her neck and face were saved when leading man Wilfred Lytell threw his heavy overcoat over her. The chauffeur of Mansfield's car was burned badly on his hands while trying to remove the burning clothing from the actress. The fire was put out, but she sustained substantial burns to her body. She was rushed to a Physicians and Surgeons Hospital in San Antonio, where she died in less than twenty-four hours; however, most of Mansfield's scenes had already been shot, so production on the film continued.
 Greed (1924), released nearly a year after Frank Hayes' death from pneumonia.
 The Son of the Sheik (1926), was publicly released a month following Rudolph Valentino's death from peritonitis, although the premiere was a month prior to Valentino's death.
 King of the Pack (1926), released nearly four months after canine actor Peter the Great's death while protecting his master; an argument had broken out between owner Edward Faust and a friend of Faust's, culminating with Faust running back to his car while the friend came out of his house with a rifle—in the process, Peter leapt up to protect his master, and was shot in the neck, lingering for three more days before dying.
 The First Auto (1927). Charles Emmett Mack died when a wagon struck his car broadside as he was driving to work. His co-star, Patsy Ruth Miller, had declined a ride because she was not needed for filming until later.
 The Wedding March (1928), released a year after the deaths of both George Nichols and Hughie Mack.
 Two Masters (1928), released nearly a month after Rex Cherryman's death from septic poisoning, which he contracted while sailing to France to read for a play in Paris; he died in Le Havre, France at age 31.
 The Rush Hour (1928), released almost five months after Ward Crane's death from pneumonia, following an attack of pleurisy that sent him to a rest cure lodge at Saranac Lake, New York.
 Show Boat (1929), released over three months after Ralph Yearsley's suicide.
 The Hottentot (1929), The Argyle Case (1929), and The Drake Case (1929), all released after Gladys Brockwell's death in an automobile accident; the car, driven by her friend Thomas Brennan, went over an  embankment on the Ventura Highway near Calabasas, and Brockwell, the passenger, ended up crushed beneath it. Brennan later said that a bit of dust had blown into his eye before the accident, temporarily blinding him. Seriously injured, Brockwell died a few days later in a Hollywood hospital from peritonitis; Brennan eventually recovered from his own injuries.

1930s
 The Way of All Men (1930), released just over three months after Anders Randolf's relapse and death following a kidney operation. 
 Gentleman's Fate (1931) and The Sin Ship (1931), both following Louis Wolheim's death.
 The Miracle Man (1932), less than five months after Tyrone Power Sr.'s death. Power was in the midst of filming the title role in a remake of the 1919 film, but collapsed and died of a heart attack in the arms of his son, Tyrone Power, Jr., while on the set; Power's part was taken up by Hobart Bosworth, but his work was not refilmed.
 Thirteen Women (1932), released the night of Peg Entwistle's suicide by jumping off the Hollywood Sign.
 Tomorrow and Tomorrow (1932), released over two months after Robert Ames' death from delirium tremens.
 I Cover the Waterfront (1933), released just six days after Ernest Torrence's death following gall bladder surgery; while en route to Europe by ship, Torrence suffered an acute attack of gall stones, but after being rushed back to a New York City hospital, he died of complications following surgery.
 Tomalio (1933), released over six months after Roscoe Arbuckle's death from a myocardial infarction.
 Wake Up and Dream (1934), released just over a month after Russ Columbo's death in a shooting accident; the singer was shot under peculiar circumstances by his longtime friend, photographer Lansing Brown, while Columbo was visiting him at home. Brown had a collection of firearms and the two men were examining various pieces. Quoting Brown's description of the accident, "I was absent-mindedly fooling around with one of the guns. [...] I had a match in my hand and when I clicked, apparently the match caught in between the hammer and the firing pin. There was an explosion. Russ slid to the side of his chair." The ball ricocheted off a nearby table and hit Columbo above the left eye. Surgeons at Good Samaritan Hospital made an unsuccessful attempt to remove the ball from Columbo's brain; he died less than six hours after the shooting. Columbo's death was ruled an accident, and Brown exonerated from blame.
 Jew Suss (1934), released six months after Gerald du Maurier's death from colon cancer.
 Steamboat Round the Bend (1935) and In Old Kentucky (1935), both released months after Will Rogers' death in an airplane crash; while being flown through Alaska by famed aviator Wiley Post, they became uncertain of their position in bad weather and landed in a lagoon to ask directions. On takeoff, the engine failed at low altitude, and the aircraft, uncontrollably nose-heavy at low speed, plunged into the lagoon, shearing off the right wing and ending inverted in the shallow water of the lagoon; both men died instantly.
 The Prisoner of Shark Island (1936), released fifteen days after O.P. Heggie's death from pneumonia.
 Frankie and Johnnie (1936), released over two years after Lilyan Tashman's death from abdominal cancer.
 Counterfeit (1936) and Poppy (1936), both released just two months after character actor Tammany Young's death from a heart attack.
 The Devil-Doll (1936) and China Clipper (1936), both released after Henry B. Walthall's death from influenza and a nervous condition.
 Saratoga (1937), following Jean Harlow's death, with 90 per cent of filming completed; a body double and two voice doubles completed the filming in Harlow's role.
 Rikas tyttö (1939), released less than two months after Finnish actress Sirkka Sari's death; Sari played the lead role in the film. At a party with the rest of the cast and crew, while shooting at the Aulanko Hotel, Sari and one of the men there (she was engaged, but the man was not her fiancé) went up to the roof of the hotel; on the flat roof, there was a several-feet high chimney, with a ladder leading up to the top. Sari mistook this chimney for a scenery balcony, climbed up, and fell into a heating boiler, where she died instantly. Because of Sari's death, the end of the film needed to be changed a bit; the crew shot further away, and so another woman had to replace Sari on these final shots. It was only Sari's third film; she was 19 years old.

1940s
 The Great Awakening (1941), released one month after Barnett Parker's death from a heart attack.
 To Be or Not to Be (1942), released one month after Carole Lombard's death in a plane crash.
 Pluto Junior (1942), released a year after Lee Millar's death.
 Above Suspicion (1943), released one month after Conrad Veidt's death from a heart attack.
 The Masked Marvel (1943), released two months after David Bacon's mysterious death; he was seen driving a car erratically in Santa Monica, California before running off the road and into the curb. Several witnesses saw him climb out of the car and stagger briefly before collapsing. As they approached, he asked them to help him, but he died before he could say anything more. A small knife wound was found in his back – the blade had punctured his lung and caused his death. When he died, Bacon was wearing only a swimsuit, and a wallet and camera were found in his car. The film from the camera was developed and found to contain only one image, that of Bacon, nude and smiling on a beach.
 Captain America (1944), whose later segments arrived at theatres following Dick Purcell's death from a heart attack, just a few weeks after shooting had wrapped.
 Hangover Square (1945), two months after Laird Cregar's death, due to complications from stomach surgery following a crash diet that included prescribed amphetamines.
 The Bashful Buzzard (1945), released one year after Kent Rogers' death in a training flight accident during World War II.
 House of Horrors (1946), The Brute Man (1946), and The Spider Woman Strikes Back (1947), all released after Rondo Hatton's death from a heart attack, due to his acromegaly.
 Lost City of the Jungle (1946), following Lionel Atwill's death, from pneumonia caused by poor health due to lung cancer, while filming this serial; Atwill was playing the mastermind villain, Sir Eric Hazarias, a chief foreign spy. Universal could not afford to throw out the footage already filmed, so they were forced to adapt the serial: Firstly, another villain (Malborn, played by John Mylong, who was originally just a servant of Sir Eric) was introduced as the boss of Atwill's character to take over most of the villain requirements of the film; secondly, a double of Atwill was used to complete his remaining scenes. The double was filmed from behind and remained silent. The villain's henchmen were filmed repeating their orders back to the silent double and stock footage of Atwill was edited in to show a response.
 The Walls Came Tumbling Down (1946) and The Imperfect Lady (1947), both released after Miles Mander's death from a heart attack.
 The Naked City (1948), released over two months after producer and narrator Mark Hellinger's death from a sudden heart attack; after Hellinger's death, executives at Universal Studios were ready to scrap the film, as they had no idea how to market it, and feared it would be a box office failure. Hellinger's widow, however, reminded the studio that Hellinger's contract for the film included a "guarantee of release" clause from Universal; having no choice, Universal released the film into theaters, and were subsequently surprised when it became a hit, garnering two Oscars for the studio.
 Noose (1948) and Brass Monkey (1948), both released after Carole Landis' suicide; Landis was reportedly crushed when her lover, actor Rex Harrison, refused to divorce his wife, Lilli Palmer, for her. She took an overdose of Seconal at her Pacific Palisades home. She had spent her final night with Harrison. The next afternoon, he and the maid discovered her on the bathroom floor. Harrison waited several hours before he called a doctor and the police. According to some sources, Landis left two suicide notes; one for her mother, and the second for Harrison, who instructed his lawyers to destroy it. During a coroner's inquest, Harrison denied knowing any motive for her suicide and told the coroner he did not know of the existence of a second suicide note.
 Red River (1948) and So Dear to My Heart (1949), both released after Harry Carey's death from a combination of lung cancer, emphysema, and coronary thrombosis in 1947; both films had been delayed due to lengthy post-production problems, including the addition of several animated sequences to the latter, a Disney film.
 Little Women (1949), released nearly four months after C. Aubrey Smith's death from pneumonia.

1950s
 Riding High (1950), released over nine months after Harry Davenport's death from a heart attack. 
 The Furies (1950), which premiered in Tucson, Arizona, over three months after Walter Huston's death from an aortic aneurysm.
The Chump Champ (1950), released two months after Frank Graham's suicide.
 Alice in Wonderland (1951), released over a year after the death of Dink Trout, who voiced the King of Hearts, and two months after the death of Larry Grey, who voiced Bill the Lizard and a card painter.
 My Son John (1952), released eight months after Robert Walker's death, from an allergic reaction to sodium amytal given to him by his psychiatrist. Because Walker died in the middle of production, parts of the film were heavily rewritten; several scenes use a double shot from behind, and others recycle footage of Walker from Strangers on a Train. The final scene, where a recording of John delivers an anti-Communist speech, is lit with a halo around the tape-recorder.
 The Golden Blade (1953), released one month after Harry E. Lang's death from a heart attack.
 Here Come the Girls (1953), released nine days after Millard Mitchell's death from lung cancer.
 All the Brothers Were Valiant (1953), released three months after Lewis Stone's death from a heart attack.
 World for Ransom (1954), released over three months after Nigel Bruce's death from a heart attack.
 Return to Treasure Island (1954), released over eight months after Porter Hall's death from a heart attack.
 Sign of the Pagan (1954), released over a month after Moroni Olsen's death.
 East of Eden (1955), released over six months after Harry Cording's death.
 Jail Busters (1955) and Dig That Uranium (1956), both released after Bernard Gorcey's death from a traffic collision.
 Rebel Without a Cause (1955) and Giant (1956), both following James Dean's death in an automobile accident in September 1955, just days after filming on the latter was completed; due to his trademark mumbling rendering him inaudible on his final scene of the film, his speech in that scene was overdubbed by his friend Nick Adams after his death. Dean received a posthumous Best Actor Oscar nomination for his work on Giant.
 Lady Godiva of Coventry (1955), released eight months after Alec Harford's death.
The Great Locomotive Chase (1956), released one year after Robert Kent's death from coronary arteriosclerosis.
 High Society (1956), released two months after Louis Calhern's death from a heart attack.
 The Ambassador's Daughter (1956) and Miami Exposé (1956), both released after Edward Arnold's death from an intracerebral hemorrhage.
 The Vagabond King (1956), released a year after Walter Hampden's death from a stroke.
 Around the World in 80 Days (1956), released almost seven months after Robert Newton's death from a heart attack, brought on by chronic alcoholism.
 Our Mr. Sun (1956), released over two years after Lionel Barrymore's death from a heart attack.
 How to Murder a Rich Uncle (1957), released one month after Katie Johnson's death.
 Jeanne Eagels (1957), released over four months after Gene Lockhart's death from a coronary thrombosis.
 Boyhood Daze (1957), released a year after Marian Richman's death.
 Kathy O' (1958) and Onionhead (1958), both released after Ainslie Pryor's death from cancer.
Born Reckless (1958), The Buccaneer (1958) and Gidget (1959), all released after Ed Hinton's death in a plane crash.
 The Inn of the Sixth Happiness (1958), released six months after Robert Donat's death.
 Sleeping Beauty (1959), released less than two years after Bob Amsberry's death in a car accident.
 Invisible Invaders (1959), released nearly four months after Philip Tonge's death.
 The 30 Foot Bride of Candy Rock (1959) and The World of Abbott and Costello (1965), both released after Lou Costello's death.
 Plan 9 from Outer Space (1959), released nearly three years after Bela Lugosi's death. He died having filmed two minutes of footage. This footage, not shot for Plan 9, but for two separate, unfinished Ed Wood projects, was combined and then inter-cut with new footage featuring a double, Tom Mason, who looked nothing like Lugosi, to put a credit for Lugosi on the picture.
 Solomon and Sheba (1959), following Tyrone Power's death of a sudden heart attack; having completed 75 per cent of the required shooting, Power's death forced the production to recast the role with Yul Brynner and reshoot most of Power's scenes. Footage of Power, however, was retained for long shots, such as in the sword fighting sequence toward the end of the film, and reels featuring the rest of Power's performance are rumored to be kept locked away in vaults to this day.
Cuban Rebel Girls (1959), released two months after Errol Flynn's death from a heart attack.

1960s
 Once More, with Feeling! (1960), released five months after Kay Kendall's death from leukemia.
 Person to Bunny (1960), released five months after Arthur Q. Bryan's death from a heart attack.
 The Sins of Rachel Cade (1961), released four months after Douglas Spencer's death from complications of diabetes.
 101 Dalmatians (1961), released three months after Basil Ruysdael's death from complications following surgery.
 The Misfits (1961), released on what would have been actor Clark Gable's 60th birthday; he suffered a heart attack two days after filming ended and died ten days later, on November 16, 1960.
 The Naked Edge (1961), released one month after Gary Cooper's death from prostate cancer.
 The Big Gamble (1961), released over seven months after Gregory Ratoff's death.
 The Roman Spring of Mrs. Stone (1961), released nearly a year after Ernest Thesiger's death.
 Advise & Consent (1962), where, appearing in two scenes as Senator McCafferty, who whenever awakened from a deep sleep automatically responds "Opposed, sir! Opposed!", was 87-year-old Henry F. Ashurst, one of the first senators elected by the state of Arizona and served five terms. Ashurst died on May 31, 1962, a week before the film's premiere.
 Merrill's Marauders (1962), released nearly a year after Jeff Chandler's death from pneumonia.
 That Touch of Mink (1962), released about eight months after Jack Livesey's death from an aneurysm.
 Billy Rose's Jumbo (1962) and The Slime People (1963), both released after Robert Burton's death from cancer.
 Papa's Delicate Condition (1963), released five months after Bob Hopkins's death.
 From Russia with Love (1963), released nearly four months after Pedro Armendáriz's suicide, following a long development of cancer that turned terminal during filming.
 The Thrill of It All (1963) and It's a Mad, Mad, Mad, Mad World (1963), both following Zasu Pitts' death from cancer; the latter film was also released nearly seven months after Don C. Harvey's death.
 McLintock! (1963), released five months after Gordon Jones's death from a heart attack.
 The Incredible Mr. Limpet (1964), released nearly five months after Larry Keating's death from leukemia.
 A Tiger Walks (1964), released just over three months after Sabu Dastagir's sudden death from a heart attack
 The Carpetbaggers (1964), released about ten weeks after Alan Ladd's death.
 Muscle Beach Party (1964) and The Patsy (1964), both released after Peter Lorre's death from a stroke.
 My Fair Lady (1964), released nearly a year after Henry Daniell's death of a myocardial infarction.
 The Pumpkin Eater (1964), released three months after Cedric Hardwicke's death from emphysema.
 Young Fury (1965), released about two months after William Bendix's death from lobar pneumonia.
 The Satan Bug (1965), released over two months after John Larkin's death.
 Cat Ballou (1965), released four months after Nat King Cole's death from lung cancer.
 Fluffy (1965), released eight months after Sammee Tong's death.
 The Greatest Story Ever Told (1965), released fifteen months after Joseph Schildkraut's death.
 Hercules and the Princess of Troy (1965), released a month after Everett Sloane's death.
 Uncle Tom's Cabin (1965), released in West Germany two months after John Kitzmiller's death.
 Madame X (1966), released eight months after Constance Bennett's death from a hemorrhagic stroke.
 The Glass Bottom Boat (1966), released three months after Alice Pearce's death from ovarian cancer.
 The Russians Are Coming, the Russians Are Coming (1966) and Incubus (1966), both released after Milos Milos' suicide in January 1966; the latter film was released just twelve days after Milos' co-star, Ann Atmar, also committed suicide.
 A Funny Thing Happened on the Way to the Forum (1966), released over eight months after Buster Keaton's death from lung cancer.
 Manos: The Hands of Fate (1966), released a month after John Reynolds' suicide; it was the only film appearance of Reynolds, who played the infamous character Torgo in the film.
 The Defector (1966), released in the United States nearly four months after Montgomery Clift's death from a heart attack.
 Casino Royale (1967), released less than a month after Duncan Macrae's death.
 The War Wagon (1967), The Reluctant Astronaut (1967), The Last Challenge (1967) and The Shakiest Gun in the West (1968), all released after Frank McGrath's death from a heart attack.
 The Gnome-Mobile (1967), released over a year after Ed Wynn's death from throat cancer.
 The Tiger Makes Out (1967), released about six months after Roland Wood's death.
 Who's Minding the Mint? (1967), released nine months after David J. Stewart's death.
 The Jungle Book (1967), released over ten months after Verna Felton's death from a stroke; Felton had voiced Colonel Hathi's wife, Winifred the elephant, in the film. 
 The film's producer, Walt Disney, died the day after Felton.
 Guess Who's Coming to Dinner (1967), released six months after Spencer Tracy's death from a heart attack and emphysema. Tracy died only seventeen days after filming wrapped, and was in failing health during the shoot – the filming schedule was altered to accommodate him. All of Tracy's scenes were filmed between 9:00 AM and noon of each day in order to give him adequate time to rest. For example, most of Tracy's dialogue scenes were filmed in such a way that during close-ups on other characters, a stand-in was substituted for him. Tracy posthumously received his ninth Oscar nomination for his work on the film.
 The Young Girls of Rochefort (1967) and Billion Dollar Brain (1967), both released after Françoise Dorléac's death at the age of 25; the older sister of French actress Catherine Deneuve died when she lost control of the rented Renault 10 she was driving and hit a sign post ten kilometers from Nice at the end of the Esterel-Côte d'Azur motorway. The car flipped over and burst into flames. Dorléac had been en route to Nice airport and was afraid of missing her flight. She was seen struggling to get out of the car, but was unable to open the door; police later identified her body only from the fragment of a cheque book, a diary, and her driving license. 
 The Wicked Dreams of Paula Schultz (1968) and The Picasso Summer (1969), both released after Theodore Marcuse's death.
 The Wild, Wild World of Jayne Mansfield (1968) and Single Room Furnished (1968), both released a year after Jayne Mansfield's death from brain trauma sustained in an automobile crash; the latter film was shot in 1966, but had its release delayed for two years.
 Never a Dull Moment (1968), released a year after Philip Coolidge's death.
 Fever Heat (1968) and Mission Mars (1968), both released after Nick Adams' death from a drug overdose.
 The Bamboo Saucer (1968), released four months after Dan Duryea's death from cancer.
 Autopsia de un fantasma (1968), released over fifteen months after Basil Rathbone's death from a heart attack.
 Skidoo (1968), released about four months following Phil Arnold's death from a heart attack; another cast member, Fred Clark, died only two weeks prior to the film's release.
 The Horse in the Gray Flannel Suit (1968), released two weeks after Fred Clark's death.
 The Night They Raided Minsky's (1968), released a year after Bert Lahr's death from pneumonia and undiagnosed terminal cancer; while working on the film, Lahr agreed to shoot an extensive night scene outdoors in New York City on a cold December night, causing him to develop the pneumonia that killed him. Due to his death occurring in the middle of production, his role was posthumously made smaller, and what footage needed to be reshot for scenes where Lahr had completed his close-ups employed burlesque legend Joey Faye, shot from behind, to fill in for Lahr.
 Once Upon a Time in the West (1968), released seven months after Al Mulock's suicide; Mulock, a noted Canadian character actor, played the gunslinger Knuckles in the opening sequence. This sequence, the last filmed in Spain on the production, was scheduled for four days; Mulock committed suicide after the third day's shooting, for reasons that are still unclear, by jumping from his hotel room window, several floors up, in full costume. Production manager Claudio Mancini and screenwriter Mickey Knox, who were sitting in a room in the hotel, witnessed Mulock's body pass by their window. Knox recalled in an interview that while Mancini put Mulock, still in his costume, in his car to drive him to the hospital, director Sergio Leone said to Mancini, "Get the costume! We need the costume!" As Mulock had already shot most of his close-ups and a few medium and wide shots, only a double, of similar height and build, was needed to complete the sequence; looking similar enough to pass, screenwriter Knox was drafted into taking Mulock's place for those shots. Mulock's absence is obvious in the last few minutes of the sequence; while the other two gunslingers, played by Woody Strode and Jack Elam, get close-up reaction shots to Charles Bronson's character, Knuckles gets none before he is shot to death.
 The Wild Bunch (1969), released over a year after Albert Dekker's death by autoerotic asphyxiation; Dekker had played Pat Harrigan, the unscrupulous railroad detective, in the film.
 The Thirteen Chairs (1969), released in Italy two months after Sharon Tate's murder.
 The Comic (1969), released a year after Pert Kelton's death from a heart attack.
 The Reivers (1969) and The Pursuit of Happiness (1971), both following Ruth White's death from cancer; the former was also released almost a month after Roy Barcroft's death.

1970s
 Skullduggery (1970), released over nine months after Rhys Williams' death.
 Patton (1970), released nearly three months after James Edwards' death from a heart attack.
 Myra Breckinridge (1970), released three months after William Hopper's death from pneumonia.
 The Syndicate: A Death in the Family (1970), released over five months after Eduardo Ciannelli's death.
 There Was a Crooked Man... (1970), released over five months after Byron Foulger's death from heart problems.
 Rabbit, Run (1970), released five months after Nydia Westman's death from cancer.
 Monte Walsh (1970), released nearly 11 months after Roy Barcroft's death.
 Road to Salina (1970), released in the U.S. nearly ten months after Ed Begley's death from a heart attack.
 Man of Violence (1970) and Underground (1970), both released after Andreas Malandrinos' death.
 Golden Eagle, released a month after Mitr Chaibancha's death from a helicopter accident while filming the last scene in the film.
 Cold Turkey (1971), released almost five months following Edward Everett Horton's death from cancer.
 Valdez Is Coming (1971), released about ten months after Frank Silvera's death from electrocution.
 Who Is Harry Kellerman and Why Is He Saying Those Terrible Things About Me? (1971), released three months following David Burns' death from a heart attack.
 The Blood on Satan's Claw (1971), released a year after Patrick Wymark's death.
 Isle of the Snake People (1971) and The Incredible Invasion (1971), both following Boris Karloff's death from emphysema.
 Escape from the Planet of the Apes (1971) and Support Your Local Gunfighter (1971), both released posthumously two months following Roy Glenn's death from cardiovascular disease.
 The Last Child (1971), released about three months after Van Heflin's death from a heart attack while swimming.
 Octaman (1971), released nearly two months after Pier Angeli's death from a barbiturate overdose.
 The Ruling Class (1972) and Gawain and the Green Knight (1973), the first released nearly four months, the second a year, after Nigel Green's death from an overdose of sleeping pills.
 Fuzz (1972), released two months after Steve Ihnat's death from a heart attack.
 Endless Night (1972) and Psychomania (1973), both following George Sanders' suicide.
 Soylent Green (1973), released three months after Edward G. Robinson's death from bladder cancer; Robinson had died twelve days after shooting on the film wrapped.
 Bang the Drum Slowly (1973), released about a month after Patrick McVey's death.
 The Exorcist (1973), released following the deaths of Jack MacGowran and Vasiliki Maliaros. This was the latter's only film appearance.
 Enter the Dragon (1973) and Game of Death (1978), both following Bruce Lee's death from cerebral edema, due to a severe allergic reaction to an Equagesic tablet; the latter was completed using several voice and body doubles throughout the film.
 The Outfit (1973) and Executive Action (1973), both following Robert Ryan's death from lung cancer.
 Tales That Witness Madness (1973), released three months after Jack Hawkins's death.
 Herbie Rides Again (1974), released about a year after Alan Carney's death from a heart attack.
 The Mutations (1974), The Abdication (1974) and Frankenstein's Castle of Freaks (1975; U.S. release), all released after Michael Dunn's suicide in 1973.
 The Strongest Man in the World (1975) and The Rescuers (1977), both released after Joe Flynn's death in 1974.
 Smoke in the Wind (1975), released over six months after Walter Brennan's death from emphysema.
 Monty Python and the Holy Grail (1975), released three months after Irish actress Bee Duffell's death; Duffell played the Old Crone whom King Arthur and Sir Bedevere shout "Ni!" at.
 Trial by Combat (1976), released nine months after Margaret Leighton's death from multiple sclerosis.
 Rogue Male (1976) and The Littlest Horse Thieves (1977; US release), both released after Alastair Sim's death from lung cancer.
 Mr. Billion (1977), released nearly seven months after William Redfield's death from leukemia.
 Nasty Habits (1977), released five months after Edith Evans' death.
 Scott Joplin (1977), released about a year after Godfrey Cambridge's death from a heart attack.
 The Mouse and His Child (1977), released nine months after Andy Devine's death from leukemia.
 The Seniors (1978), released a year after Alan Reed's death from a heart attack.
 Watership Down (1978), released a year after Zero Mostel's death from an aortic aneurysm, following a respiratory disorder due to a nutritionally unsound diet he took in the last four months of his life.
 The Deer Hunter (1978), released nearly nine months after John Cazale's death from lung cancer.
 The Mafu Cage (1978) and A Woman Called Moses (1978), both released after Will Geer's death from respiratory insufficiency.
 Force 10 from Navarone (1978) and Avalanche Express (1979), both following Robert Shaw's death from a heart attack, while on break from shooting Express; the role was completed with a double filmed from behind. Because Shaw was so ill during filming, his voice and delivery were subsequently very weak and shaky. After his death, his voice was dubbed by actor Robert Rietty, although impressionist Rich Little also dubbed three words near the end of the picture ("Harry, come on"), and six words in Shaw's own voice were deemed usable ("Too hot in that train" and "Harry").
 Last Embrace (1979), released nearly five months after Lou Gilbert's death.
 The Muppet Movie (1979) released nine months after Edgar Bergen's death from kidney disease; he had died during the film's production, after filming his scene.
 Porridge (1979), released five months after Richard Beckinsale's death.
 The Flintstones Meet Rockula and Frankenstone (1979) and Flash Gordon: The Greatest Adventure of All (1982), both released after Ted Cassidy's death following complications from heart surgery.

1980s
 City in Fear (1980) and High Ice (1980), both released after David Janssen's death from a heart attack.
 Brubaker (1980), released just under a year after Richard Ward's death from a heart ailment.
 The Fiendish Plot of Dr. Fu Manchu (1980), released less than a month after Peter Sellers' death from a heart attack. A second film, Trail of the Pink Panther (1982), which went into production a year after his death in 1980, used deleted footage from The Pink Panther Strikes Again and various flashbacks to other previous films in the series to construct a "performance" from him.
 George and Mildred (1980), released after the death of Yootha Joyce.
 The Secret of Nikola Tesla (1980), released six weeks after Strother Martin's death from a heart attack.
 Charlie Chan and the Curse of the Dragon Queen (1981) and The Wall (1982), both released after Rachel Roberts' death from a drug overdose.
 Heavy Metal (1981), released after Douglas Kenney's death from a fall in 1980. Douglas posthumously voiced a regolian.
 The Woman Inside (1981), released two years after Joan Blondell's death from leukemia.
 They All Laughed (1981), released exactly a year after Dorothy Stratten's murder by her estranged husband and manager, Paul Snider; he committed suicide the same day.
 Ghost Story (1981), released four months after Melvyn Douglas' death. The Hot Touch (1982), which also featured Douglas, was released over a year after his death.
 Reds (1981), released following the deaths of the following "Witnesses": Roger Nash Baldwin; Andrew Dasburg; Will Durant; George Jessel; Isaac Don Levine; Arthur Mayer; and Henry Miller. Jessel would later have another posthumous release, The Other Side of the Wind (2018).
 Barbarosa (1982), released seven months after George Voskovec's death from a heart attack.
 My Body, My Child (1982), released almost five months after Jack Albertson's death from colorectal cancer.
 Hey Good Lookin' (1982), released over a year after Frank de Kova's death from heart failure.
 Kamikaze 1989 (1982), released just over a month after Rainer Werner Fassbinder's death from heart failure, due to a lethal mixture of sleeping pills and cocaine.
 Blue Thunder (1983) and Tough Enough (1983), both following Warren Oates' death.
 Twilight Zone: The Movie (1983), following the deaths of Vic Morrow and Eduard Franz. The former died in a helicopter accident on the set, which also claimed the lives of two child co-stars.
 Yellowbeard (1983) and Slapstick of Another Kind (1984; US release), both following Marty Feldman's death in December 1982 from a sudden heart attack; his work on Yellowbeard had not yet been completed at the time of his death, and a stunt double, filmed later, was used to kill his character off and finish the role.
 Class (1983) and Grandview, U.S.A. (1984), both released after George Womack's death.
 Daniel (1983), released eight months after Will Lee's death from a heart attack.
 Brainstorm (1983), released nearly two years after Natalie Wood's death from drowning, during a break from principal photography; a body double and obscuring camera techniques were used to complete Wood's scenes. 
 Sleepaway Camp (1983), following Mike Kellin's death from lung cancer.
 Curse of the Pink Panther (1983), released twelve days after David Niven's death from motor neurone disease.
8 Diagram Pole Fighter (1983), released after its leading actor Alexander Fu Sheng died in a car accident whilst the film was still in production. To complete the film, the script was re-written and Fu Sheng's character abruptly disappears halfway with Gordon Liu's character taking over as the lead.
 Greystoke: The Legend of Tarzan, Lord of the Apes (1984) and Give My Regards to Broad Street (1984), both following Ralph Richardson's death.
 1984 (1984), following Richard Burton's death.
 The Chain (1984), released two months after Charlotte Long's death in a car accident.
 The Assisi Underground (1984), A.D. (1985), The Shooting Party (1985), and Dr. Fischer of Geneva (1985), all released after James Mason's death from a heart attack at his home in Lausanne, Switzerland.
 Bad Manners (1984), released about two months after Richard Deacon's death from a heart attack.
 The Prey (1984), released eight months after Jackie Coogan's death from heart failure.
 The Glitter Dome (1984) and On the Edge (1986), both released after John Marley's death following complications from heart surgery.
 Johnny Dangerously (1984), released one month after Sudie Bond's death from a respiratory ailment.
 Steaming (1985), released one year after Diana Dors's death from ovarian cancer.
 The Stuff (1985), released nearly four months after Alexander Scourby's death from a heart attack.
 National Lampoon's European Vacation (1985) and Pirates (1986), both released after Jacques Maury's death.
 Maxie (1985) and The Trouble with Spies (1987), both released after Ruth Gordon's death from a stroke; the latter film was shot in 1984, but was not released until three years later.
 Fever Pitch (1985) and The Return of Josey Wales (1986), both released after Rafael Campos's death from stomach cancer.
The Adventures of the American Rabbit (1986), released five months after Bob Holt's death from a heart attack.
 Hannah and Her Sisters (1986), released over four months after Lloyd Nolan's death from lung cancer.
 9½ Weeks (1986) and Poltergeist II: The Other Side (1986), both released after Julian Beck's death from stomach cancer the year before; in the case of the latter film, Beck's voice (due to his illness) proved so weak that many of his lines were later redubbed by voice actor Corey Burton, and his death during principal photography necessitated further rewrites with various demonic stand-ins taking his place.
 Pretty in Pink (1986) and Animal Behavior (1989), both following Alexa Kenin's death in September 1985.
 Club Paradise (1986), following Adolph Caesar's death from a heart attack.
 Enchanted Journey (1986; U.S. release), The Transformers: The Movie (1986) and Someone to Love (1987), all released after Orson Welles' death in 1985.
 Hunk (1987), The Chair (1988) and That's Adequate (1989), all following James Coco's death in February 1987.
 Made in U.S.A. (1987) and Backfire (1988), both released after Dean Paul Martin's death in a plane crash.
 Maid to Order (1987) and Rented Lips (1988), both released after Dick Shawn's death.
 Rock Odyssey (1987), released eight months after Scatman Crothers' death from lung cancer.
 Superman IV: The Quest for Peace (1987), released over five months after Esmond Knight's death from a heart attack.
 The Big Easy (1987) and She Must Be Seeing Things (1988), both released after Charles Ludlam's death.
 Amazon Women on the Moon (1987), released five months after Le Tari's death from a heart attack and nearly ten months after Herb Vigran's death from cancer.
 The Puppetoon Movie (1987), and The Wind in the Willows (1987; television film), both released seven and eight months, respectively, after Paul Frees' death.
 Three O'Clock High (1987), released nearly four months after Vivian Brown's death.
 The Running Man (1987), released two months after Erland Van Lidth De Jeude's death.
 Little Dorrit (1987), released over nine months after Joan Greenwood's death from acute bronchitis.
 She's Having a Baby (1988), released nine months after Cathryn Damon's death from ovarian cancer.
 Beetlejuice (1988), released three months after Simmy Bow's death from a stroke.
 White Mischief (1988; U.S. release), The Dawning (1988) and The Unholy (1988), all following Trevor Howard's death.
 Poltergeist III (1988), released four months after Heather O'Rourke's death; due to test audience problems, the film's ending was reshot a month after her death, using a body double from behind in shots of O'Rourke's character.
Rockin' with Judy Jetson (1988) and Yogi and the Invasion of the Space Bears (1988), both released after Daws Butler's death from a heart attack.
Scooby-Doo and the Ghoul School (1988; television film), released nine months after Marilyn Schreffler's death from liver cancer.
 The Land Before Time (1988) and All Dogs Go to Heaven (1989), both released after Judith Barsi's murder by her own father.
 Scrooged (1988), Another Chance (1989), Meet the Hollowheads (1989), and Homer & Eddie (1989), all following Anne Ramsey's death from esophageal cancer.
 The Naked Gun (1988), following John Houseman's death.
 Pumpkinhead (1988), released ten months after Madeleine Taylor Holmes's death.
 A Man for All Seasons (1988; television film), The Return of the Musketeers (1989) and The Princess and the Goblin (1992), all released following Roy Kinnear's death from a heart attack, due to an accident while filming Musketeers in September 1988 in which he fell off a horse and broke his pelvis; his role was completed by using a stand-in for two crucial scenes, filmed from behind, and dubbed-in lines from a voice artist.
 Three Fugitives (1989), released shortly after Kenneth McMillan's death.
 Field of Dreams (1989), released four months after Anne Seymour's death.
 Miss Firecracker (1989), Great Balls of Fire! (1989) and Welcome Home (1989), all released after Trey Wilson's death from a cerebral hemorrhage.
 Out of the Dark (1989), released a year after Divine's death from Enlarged heart.
 To Die For (1989), released a year after Duane Jones' death.
 UHF (1989), released nearly a year after Trinidad Silva's death in a car accident, involving a collision with a drunken driver in Whittier, California, during production; had Silva survived, the film would have explored and developed the character he played, Raul, a little better, such as the fact that he was a postal worker, and would have shown an additional scene involving the revenge of the poodle he had thrown out of a 2-story-high window during the taping of his character's show. Aside from various scenes being rewritten to exclude his character, the scene with the attacking poodles was actually filmed using another actor doubling for Silva, with stuffed poodles attached to his body and covering his face; however, the scene was not included in the film's final cut.
 Venus Peter (1989) and We're No Angels (1989), both released after Ray McAnally's death from a heart attack.
 The Little Mermaid (1989), released four months after Ben Wright's death, who played Grimsby, Prince Eric's caretaker.

1990s
 The Exorcist III (1990), released two months after Barbara Baxley's death from cardiac arrest.
 The Sheltering Sky (1990), released two months after Jill Bennett's death from a suicidal drug overdose.
 Down the Drain (1990), released a year after John Matuszak's death from a drug overdose.
 Awakenings (1990), released eight months after Dexter Gordon's death from kidney failure and laryngeal cancer.
 Voyage of Terror: The Achille Lauro Affair (1990) and The End of Innocence (1990), both released a year after Rebecca Schaeffer's murder.
 King of the Wind (1990), released just over seven months after Anthony Quayle's death from hepatocellular carcinoma.
 Thieves of Fortune (1990), released about five months after Lee Van Cleef's death from a heart attack.
 Jetsons: The Movie (1990), following the deaths of George O'Hanlon from a stroke and Mel Blanc from emphysema, coronary artery disease in 1989; O'Hanlon and Blanc were, respectively, the voices of George Jetson and Mr. Spacely. Because they both died during production, Jeff Bergman had to fill in remaining lines for both characters.
 Mo' Better Blues (1990), released five months after actor/comedian Robin Harris' death from a heart attack.
 Buried Alive (1990) and Jack-O (1995), following the death of John Carradine in 1988. 
 Jack-O was also released after the death of Cameron Mitchell, along with The Other Side of the Wind (2018).
 Too Much Sun (1991), released five months after Howard Duff's death from a heart attack.
 Career Opportunities (1991), released one year after Marc Clement's death.
 Muppet*Vision 3D (1991), released at Walt Disney World following Jim Henson's death from pneumonia.
 Life Stinks (1991), The Vagrant (1992) and Blood In Blood Out (1993), released after Theodore Wilson's death from a stroke.
 Voodoo Dawn (1991) and Timebomb (1991), both released a year after Raymond St. Jacques' death.
 Article 99 (1992), released six months after Julie Bovasso's death from cancer.
 Mom and Dad Save the World (1992), released nine months after Thalmus Rasulala's death from heart failure.
 Highway to Hell (1992), released a year after Kevin Peter Hall's death from opportunistic infection.
 Bed & Breakfast (1992), released nearly a year after Colleen Dewhurst's death.
 Strictly Ballroom (1992), released four months after Pat Thomson's death.
 Billy Bunny's Animal Songs (1993; direct-to-video), released a year after Richard Hunt's death.
 The Thief and the Cobbler (1993), released after the deaths of Anthony Quayle, Clinton Sundberg, Eddie Byrne, Ramsay Williams, Kenneth Williams and Felix Aylmer.
 The Age of Innocence (1993), released four months after Alexis Smith's death.
 Gettysburg (1993), following Richard Jordan's death from brain cancer; Jordan portrayed Confederate Brig. Gen. Lewis "Lo" Armistead in the film.
 Bloodfist V: Human Target (1994), released a month after Steve James' death from pancreatic cancer.
 Silent Tongue (1994), released the year after River Phoenix's death; another, uncompleted film, Dark Blood, was released in 2012 with director George Sluizer's narration filling in for the missing scenes.
 The Crow (1994), released one year after Brandon Lee's death from a firearms accident while filming on the set. A body double and CGI was used to complete the film. This was one of the first films to use CGI for completing an actor's scene after their death.
 Corrina, Corrina (1994), following Don Ameche's death from prostate cancer.
 Wagons East! (1994) and Canadian Bacon (1995), both released after John Candy's death from a heart attack. The latter had already been completed a year before Candy's death but had a delayed release. The former was still in production at the time of Candy's death and was completed using CGI and a stunt double. A third film, Hostage for a Day (1994), was released a month after his death.
 Trading Mom (1994), released a year after André the Giant's death from heart failure.
 Il Postino: The Postman (1994), released three months after Massimo Troisi's death from a heart attack just hours after filming his last scene in the film.
 Radioland Murders (1994), released over seven months after Anita Morris' death from ovarian cancer, which she had had for over 14 years.
 Camilla (1994) and Nobody's Fool (1994), both released after Jessica Tandy's death from ovarian cancer.
 Street Fighter (1994) and Down Came a Blackbird (1995; television film), both released after Raul Julia's death from a stroke.
 La Cité de la peur (1994), includes archive footage of Bruno Carette who died five years prior due to progressive multifocal leukoencephalopathy.
 The Quick and the Dead (1995), released just over a month after Woody Strode's death from lung cancer.
 Bye Bye Love (1995), released about three weeks after Ed Flanders' suicide by gunshot.
 A Goofy Movie (1995), following Pat Buttram's death from kidney failure.
 Halloween: The Curse of Michael Myers (1995), following Donald Pleasence's death.
 Higher Learning (1995), following Dedrick D. Gobert's death.
 Waterworld (1995) and Joe's Apartment (1996), both released after Rick Aviles' death from heart failure.
 The Land Before Time III: The Time of the Great Giving (1995; direct-to-video) and The Land Before Time IV: Journey Through the Mists (1996; direct-to-video), both following Linda Gary's death from complications of brain cancer.
 They Bite (1996), released over two weeks after Charlie Barnett's death.
 Danger Zone (1996), released a year after Alexander Godunov's death.
 The Hunchback of Notre Dame (1996), following Mary Wickes' death in October 1995; because Wickes, who voiced Laverne the gargoyle, died before finishing the required voice work on the film, the producers hired Jane Withers to provide the remaining dialogue. 
 Hit Me (1996), released almost seven months after Haing S. Ngor's death by gunshot.
 Bullet (1996), Gridlock'd (1997) and Gang Related (1997), all released after Tupac Shakur's murder.
 In addition, music videos for Tupac Shakur's singles "Toss It Up" and "To Live & Die in L.A." from the album The Don Killuminati: The 7 Day Theory featured Tupac himself and were released after his death.
 The Crucible (1996) and The Substance of Fire (1996), both released after Tom McDermott's death.
 The Evening Star (1996), released over eight months after Ben Johnson's death.
 Suddenly (1996) and Liar Liar (1997), released after following Jason Bernard's death from a heart attack.
 Cats Don't Dance (1997), released one year following Gene Kelly's death from stroke.
 Lost Highway (1997), released less than a month after Jack Nance's death.
 Private Parts (1997), released three months after Tiny Tim's death from a heart attack.
 Out to Sea (1997), released nearly six weeks after Edward Mulhare's death from lung cancer.
 Fire Down Below (1997) and Boogie Nights (1997), released seven and eight months, respectively, after Robert Ridgely's death from cancer.
 Mouse Hunt (1997), released almost six months after William Hickey's death from emphysema and bronchitis.
 FairyTale: A True Story (1997), released four months after Don Henderson's death.
 Ambushed (1998) and Mind Rage (2001), released following Charles Hallahan's death by heart attack in 1997.
 Blues Brothers 2000 (1998), released about a month after Junior Wells' death.
 Almost Heroes (1998) and Dirty Work (1998), both released after Chris Farley's death from a drug overdose of speedball.
 The Negotiator (1998) and Pleasantville (1998), both released after J. T. Walsh's death from a sudden heart attack.
 Small Soldiers (1998) and Buster & Chauncey's Silent Night (1998; direct-to-video), all following Phil Hartman's death.
 Jane Austen's Mafia! (1998) and Meeting Daddy (2000), both following Lloyd Bridges' death.
 Mob Queen (1998), released a year after Will Hare's death.
 A Bug's Life (1998), released a month after Roddy McDowall's death.
 Home Fries (1998), released five months after Theresa Merritt's death.
 The Other Sister (1999), released a month following Harvey Miller's death.
 Lost & Found (1999), released eight months following Phil Leeds' death
Toy Story 2 (1999), Scooby-Doo and the Alien Invaders (2000; direct-to-video), The Life and Adventures of Santa Claus (2000; direct-to-video), Lady and the Tramp II: Scamp's Adventure (2001; direct-to-video), and Balto II: Wolf Quest (2002; direct-to-video), all released after Mary Kay Bergman's death from suicide.
 Pushing Tin (1999), released after Richard Bauer's death.

2000s
 An Extremely Goofy Movie (2000), released four months after Paddi Edwards' death from respiratory failure.
Two Family House (2000), released a year after Richard B. Shull's death from a heart attack.
 Gladiator (2000), following Oliver Reed's death; a body double, augmented by CGI, was used to complete Reed's scenes.
 Train Ride (2000), following Esther Rolle's death in 1998.
 Sex and a Girl (2001), released five months after David Dukes' death.
 Daddy and Them (2001) and Atlantis: The Lost Empire (2001), both released a year after Jim Varney's death from complications of lung cancer.
Osmosis Jones (2001), released nine months after Joe C.'s death.
 Out Cold (2001), released nine months after Lewis Arquette's death.
 Queen of the Damned (2002), following Aaliyah's death.
 Harry Potter and the Chamber of Secrets (2002) and Kaena: The Prophecy (2004; U.S. release), both released after Richard Harris' death from Hodgkin's lymphoma.
 Avenging Angelo (2002), following Anthony Quinn's death.
 Crime and Punishment (2002), released four years after Patricia Hayes' death.
 Anger Management (2003), following Lynne Thigpen's death; Thigpen made a cameo appearance in the film as Judge Brenda Daniels.
 House of 1000 Corpses (2003), released in 2003 but filmed in 2000, following Dennis Fimple's death in 2002.
 Kill the Poor (2003), released eight months after Cliff Gorman's death from leukemia.
 Out of the Ashes (2003; television film), Rambo (2008) and Rambo: Last Blood (2019) were released after Richard Crenna's death from heart failure. 
 Rambo and Rambo: Last Blood used archive footage of Crenna as  Colonel Trautman from previous films.
 Finding Home (2003), released two years after Jason Miller's death.
 Holes (2003), released over six months after Scott Plank's death in a car accident.
 The Matrix Reloaded (2003), released two years after Gloria Foster's death from diabetes.
 Open Range (2003) and The Polar Express (2004), both released after Michael Jeter's death from an epileptic seizure. The latter movie had his voice work completed by André Sogliuzzo.
 Swing (2003) and Back by Midnight (2005), both following Nell Carter's death.
 Bad Santa (2003), Clifford's Really Big Movie (2004), and Stanley's Dinosaur Round-Up (2006; direct-to-video), all released after John Ritter's death from undisclosed aortic dissection.
 Sky Captain and the World of Tomorrow (2004), released fifteen years after Laurence Olivier's death.
The Nutcracker and the Mouse King (2004), Muhammad: The Last Prophet (2004; U.S. release), and Mobile Suit Gundam F91 (2004; U.S. release), all following Tony Pope's death.
 The Incredibles (2004), released two months after Frank Thomas' death.
 Back by Midnight (2005), Angels with Angles (2005) and The Onion Movie (2008), all following Rodney Dangerfield's death in 2004.
 Be Cool (2005), released almost a year after Robert Pastorelli's death.
 Bad Girls From Valley High (2005; direct-to-video), following Jonathan Brandis' suicide by hanging and Janet Leigh's death from a heart attack.
 Keeping Mum (2005), following James Booth's death.
 Lords of Dogtown (2005), following Mitch Hedberg's death.
 Pooh's Heffalump Halloween Movie and Kronk's New Groove (2005; both direct-to-video), following John Fiedler's death; as Fiedler died during production of the former, Travis Oates was hired to finish Piglet's remaining dialogue in some scenes.
 Forbidden Warrior (2005), released two years after Kay E. Kuter's death.
 The Darwin Awards (2006), Holly (2006), King of Sorrow (2007; television film) and Aftermath (2013), all following Chris Penn's death.
 Something New (2006), released five months after Stanley DeSantis' death.
 Spymate (2006), Only the Brave (2006), 18 Fingers of Death! (2006), Royal Kill (2009), Act Your Age (2011), Blunt Movie (2013), Rice Girl (2014) and The Real Miyagi (2015), all released after Pat Morita's death in November 2005.
 Unbeatable Harold (2006), released in film festivals a year after Nicole DeHuff's death from pneumonia. 
 Everyone's Hero (2006), released six months after Dana Reeve's death from complications of lung cancer.
 Happy Feet (2006), following Steve Irwin's death.
 Cars (2006), following Joe Ranft's death.
 Superman II: The Richard Donner Cut (2006), following the deaths of Marlon Brando and Christopher Reeve; for sequences where shots of Reeve had never been filmed, a double was used. In addition, another film featuring Brando, Superman Returns (2006), was released two years after his death.
 Air Buddies (2006; direct-to-video), following the deaths of Patrick Cranshaw and Don Knotts.
 Illegal Aliens (2007), following Anna Nicole Smith's death from a drug overdose.
 Albert Fish  (2007), released seven months after Tony Jay's death
 Waitress (2007), released just over six months after Adrienne Shelly's murder at the hands of Diego Pillco; the Ecuadorian immigrant was caught stealing money from Shelly and decided to strangle her to death with a bedsheet, then frame it as a suicide by hanging.
 TMNT (2007) and Rise: Blood Hunter (2007), both released nearly a year after Mako Iwamatsu's death from respiratory arrest caused by esophageal tumor.
 All Roads Lead Home (2008), released almost two years after Peter Boyle's death.
 The Dark Knight (2008) and The Imaginarium of Doctor Parnassus (2009), both released after Heath Ledger's death from acute intoxication by the combined effects of oxycodone, hydrocodone, diazepam, temazepam, alprazolam and doxylamine, as part of an attempted self-treatment of insomnia and a respiratory illness; Johnny Depp, Jude Law, Colin Farrell, and stand-in Zander Gladish completed filming for Ledger's role in The Imaginarium of Doctor Parnassus, while filming for The Dark Knight had already been completed.
 The Informers (2008), following Brad Renfro's death.
 Stargate: Continuum (2008), Far Cry (2008) and The Uninvited (2009), all following Don S. Davis' death.
Fly Me to the Moon (2008), released three years after Charles Rocket's suicide.
 Soul Men (2008), Madagascar: Escape 2 Africa (2008), and Old Dogs (2009), all released after Bernie Mac's death from complications of pneumonia; singer Isaac Hayes, who died a day after Mac, also appeared in Soul Men, he also posthumously appeared in Kill Switch (2008), and Return to Sleepaway Camp (2008).
 Delgo (2008), released over three years following the deaths of Anne Bancroft and John Vernon.
 Star Trek (2009) and Hamlet A.D.D. (2014), both released after Majel Barrett's death from leukemia in December 2008.
 Harry Potter and the Half-Blood Prince (2009), released a year after actor Rob Knox's murder.
 Cinéman (2009) and Gainsbourg (Vie héroïque) (2010), both released after Lucy Gordon's suicide.
 Scooby-Doo! The Mystery Begins (2009; television film), released nearly three months after Lorena Gale's death.
 Michael Jackson's This Is It (2009), released four months after the death of Michael Jackson.
The Bolt Who Screwed Christmas (2009; short film), released seven years after Jonathan Harris' death from a blood clot to the heart.

2010s
 Do Not Disturb (2010), Decisions (2011), and The Dead Sea (2014), all released after Corey Haim's death from diffuse alveolar damage and pneumonia both with  hypertrophic cardiomyopathy and coronary arteriosclerosis.
 Iron Man 2 (2010), released nearly a year after Adam Goldstein's death from a drug overdose.
 Love Ranch (2010), released a year after Harve Presnell's death from pancreatic cancer.
 True Legend (2010), Dinocroc vs. Supergator (2010; television film), Stretch (2011) Eldorado (2012), The Banksters, Madoff with America (2013), Night of the Templar (2013), and The American Connection (2017), all released following David Carradine's death from asphyxiation in June 2009.
 Medium Raw: Night of the Wolf (2010; television film), released a year and a half after Andrew Martin's death.
 Abandoned (2010) and Something Wicked (2014), both released after Brittany Murphy's death from pneumonia in December 2009.
 The Wildest Dream (2010), released over a year after Natasha Richardson's death from an epidural hematoma, following a head injury she sustained while taking a beginners' skiing course; she was not wearing a helmet at the time, and refused medical treatment following the accident, only to collapse in her hotel room three hours later.
 Jelly (2010), released after Ed McMahon's death in June 2009.
 Alpha and Omega (2010), The Last Film Festival (2016), and The Other Side of the Wind (2018), all released following Dennis Hopper's death from prostate cancer that had metastasized to his bones.
 Barney's Version (2010), Casino Jack (2010), Conduct Unbecoming (2011), and The Drunk and On Drugs Happy Fun Time Hour (2011), all following Maury Chaykin's death, on his 61st birthday, from complications of a heart valve infection.
 Finding Gauguin (2010), released ten days after Glenn Shadix's death from blunt trauma.
 Love & Other Drugs (2010) and Bridesmaids (2011), both following Jill Clayburgh's death from leukemia.
 Iron Cross (2011), released over three years after Roy Scheider's death from multiple myeloma; as Scheider died before production was finished, his scenes were completed using CGI techniques to stand in for the actor.
 Killing Bono (2011), released less than three months after Pete Postlethwaite's death from pancreatic cancer.
 Stonerville (2011), released after Leslie Nielsen's death from pneumonia.
 Living Will (2011), Booted (2012), and The Bates Haunting (2012), all released after Ryan Dunn's death from car accident.
 The Cup (2011), released nearly five months after Bill Hunter's death from liver cancer.
 The Ghastly Love of Johnny X (2012), released two years after Kevin McCarthy's death from pneumonia.
 Sparkle (2012), released over six months after actress/singer Whitney Houston's death from drowning in a bathtub, due to the effects of chronic cocaine use and heart disease. 
 H4 (2012), released after Heavy D's death from pulmonary embolism in November 2011. 
 Dark Shadows (2012), released a month after Jonathan Frid's death from pneumonia and complications after a fall.
 Nature Calls (2012), released nearly a year after Patrice O'Neal's death from a stroke caused by the type 2 diabetes.
 Paranormal Activity 4 (2012), released a month after Stephen Dunham's death from a heart attack.
 On the Road (2012), released a year after Michael Sarrazin's death from mesothelioma.
 In the Hive (2012), A Resurrection (2013), Legend of Kung Fu Rabbit (2013; U.S. release) and The Challenger (2015), all released after Michael Clarke Duncan's death from a heart attack.
 Joe (2013), released in the Venice Film Festival six months after Gary Poulter's death.
 The Smurfs 2 (2013), released three months after Jonathan Winters' death from natural causes.
 College Debts (2013), released after Celeste Holm's death.
 Prince Avalanche (2013), released a year after Lance LeGault's death from heart failure.
 About Time (2013), released after Richard Griffiths' death.
 All the Wrong Reasons (2013) and McCanick (2013), both released two months after Cory Monteith's death from a drug overdose.
 Get a Horse! (2013), released after the deaths of Walt Disney, Marcellite Garner, and Billy Bletcher; the film used archival recordings of the actors to construct a "performance" from them as Mickey Mouse, Minnie Mouse, and Peg-Leg Pete respectively.
 Enough Said (2013) and The Drop (2014), released after James Gandolfini's death.
Manam (2014), Pratibimbalu (2022), both released after Akkineni Nageswara Rao's death in January 2014.
 Brick Mansions (2014) and Furious 7 (2015), both released after Paul Walker's death in a car accident; a third film, Hours (2013), had premiered at a March 2013 film festival, but only went into wide release 13 days after Walker's death. When Furious 7 resumed filming in April 2014, it was announced Walker's brothers, actors Caleb and Cody, and John Brotherton were used as stand-in body doubles to complete his role.
 One Love (2014; television film), released two years after Sherman Hemsley's death from superior vena cava syndrome.
Authors Anonymous (2014) and Lucky Stiff (2014), both released a year after Dennis Farina's death.
Muffin Top: A Love Story (2014), released after Marcia Wallace's death.
Hamlet A.D.D. (2014), and Black Licorice (2019), both released a year after Kumar Pallana's death.
 Wish I Was Here (2014), released after James Avery's death.
 Decline of an Empire (2014), and Diamond Cartel (2015), both released after Peter O'Toole's death from stomach cancer.
 Pokémon the Movie: Diancie and the Cocoon of Destruction (2014), released after Tomoyuki Dan's death.
 Angry Video Game Nerd: The Movie (2014), released after Justin Carmical's suicide; he voiced some additional characters in the film.
 Asthma (2014), released five months after Rene Ricard's death.
 The Hunger Games: Mockingjay – Part 1 (2014), and The Hunger Games: Mockingjay – Part 2 (2015), both released following Philip Seymour Hoffman's death from a drug overdose; a further two films, God's Pocket (2014) and A Most Wanted Man (2014), had appeared in film festivals a month before Hoffman's death, but only went into wide release following his death.
 Scavenger Killers (2014), and Bleeding Hearts (2015) both released after Charles Durning's death from natural causes. 
 The Town That Dreaded Sundown (2014), and Chief Zabu (2016), both released after Ed Lauter's death the previous year from mesothelioma.
 A Merry Friggin' Christmas (2014), Night at the Museum: Secret of the Tomb (2014), and Absolutely Anything (2015), all released after Robin Williams' death from suicide by hanging; a further film Boulevard (2014) had appeared in film festivals a few months before Williams' death, but only went into wide release following his death.
 Night at the Museum: Secret of the Tomb was also released after Mickey Rooney's death from natural causes.
 Last Knights (2015) and Sword of Vengeance (2015), both released a year after Dave Legeno's death due to heat stroke.
 De ontsnapping ("The Escape") (2015), released a year released after Rik Mayall's death from a heart attack.
 Tomorrowland (2015), Pound of Flesh (2015) and Kickboxer: Vengeance (2016), all released after Darren Shahlavi's death.
 Jurassic World (2015) was released nine months after Richard Attenborough's death in August 2014, Jurassic World uses the archive recording of Attenborough as John Hammond from the original series of the first two films.
 Angels in Notting Hill (2015), The Hunting of the Snark (2017; short film), and The Time War (2018), all released after Christopher Lee's death from heart failure.
 The Peanuts Movie (2015), released seven years after Bill Melendez' death in 2008; the film used archival recordings of Melendez to play the voices of Snoopy and Woodstock.
 Ana Maria in Novela Land (2015), Girl on the Edge (2015), Grandma (2015) and The Song of Sway Lake (2018), all released after Elizabeth Peña's death from cirrhosis of the liver in October 2014.
 1001 Inventions and the World of Ibn Al-Haytham (2015), released after Omar Sharif's death from heart attack.
 Star Wars: The Force Awakens (2015) and Star Wars: The Rise of Skywalker (2019), both released more than a decade after Alec Guinness' death in 2000; both films used digitally altered archive audio of Guinness involving Obi-Wan Kenobi.
 God's Not Dead 2 (2016), released five months after Fred Dalton Thompson's death from lymphoma.
 The Jungle Book (2016), released a month after Garry Shandling's death.
 London Has Fallen (2016), released after Alex Giannini's death.
 Alice Through the Looking Glass (2016), released four months after Alan Rickman's death.
 Tom and Jerry: Back to Oz (2016; direct-to-video), released four months after Joe Alaskey's death from cancer.
The Bet (2016) and The Chair (2016) both released after Roddy Piper's death.
 Independence Day: Resurgence (2016), The Red Maple Leaf (2016), Cries of the Unborn (2017) and The Savant (2019), all released after Robert Loggia's death from Alzheimer's disease in December 2015.
 The Red Maple Leaf, The Escort (2016; short film), Job's Daughter (2016), and Zizi and Honeyboy (2018; short film), was also released after Doris Roberts' death.
 Scooby-Doo! and WWE: Curse of the Speed Demon (2016; direct-to-video), released a year after Dusty Rhodes' death from kidney failure.
 Star Trek Beyond (2016), Porto (2016), We Don't Belong Here (2017), Rememory (2017) and Thoroughbreds (2017) all released after Anton Yelchin's death in a fatal car accident.
 The Matchbreaker (2016), released four months after Christina Grimmie's death from a gunshot. This was also her only motion picture performance. 
The Secrets of Emily Blair (2016), released nearly seven months after Larry Drake's death.
 Bomb City (2017), released after Ron Lester's death from liver and kidney failure.
 It's Not My Fault and I Don't Care Anyway (2017), The Clapper (2017) and Love's Last Resort (2017), all released after Alan Thicke's death from aortic dissection.
 Asylum of Darkness (2017), The Pod (2017), and Diminuendo (2018), all released after Richard Hatch's death from pancreatic cancer.
 Beauty and the Beast (2017), released a year after Rita Davies' death.
 Teen Titans: The Judas Contract (2017; direct-to-video), released three months after Miguel Ferrer's death from heart failure and complications of throat cancer.
 That Good Night (2017), My Name Is Lenny (2017), and Damascus Cover (2017), all released after John Hurt's death.
 The Circle (2017), released two months after Bill Paxton's death.
 Billboard (2017), released two years after Darlene Cates' death.
 Cars 3 (2017), released nearly nine years after Paul Newman's death; the film used unused archive recordings of Newman from the first film for flashback scenes featuring Doc Hudson, voiced by Newman.
 The film also used unused archive recordings of Tom Magliozzi, who died nearly three years before the film's release.
 The Saint (2017), released nearly two months after Roger Moore's death from cancer of the lung and liver.
 Despicable Me 3 (2017), released a month after John Cygan's death. He voices some additional characters in the film.
 6 Days, King Charles III, Victoria & Abdul, and The Little Vampire 3D (both 2017), all released after Tim Pigott-Smith's death.
 Batman vs. Two-Face (2017, direct-to-video), released four months after Adam West's death from leukemia.
 Just Getting Started (2017) and Making Babies (2018), released six and eight months, respectively, after Glenne Headly's death from a pulmonary embolism.
 Star Wars: The Last Jedi (2017), Have a Good Trip: Adventures in Psychedelics (2020) and Wonderwell (2022) all released after Carrie Fisher's death from a cardiac arrest in 2016. 
 Fisher also appeared in Star Wars: The Rise of Skywalker (2019) through the use of repurposed unreleased footage from Star Wars: The Force Awakens (2015). For a flashback scene they used repurposed footage from Return of the Jedi (1983) where her daughter Billie Lourd was used as stand-in body double to play the younger version of Fisher's character. There had also been plans to include unseen footage of Fisher from Star Wars: The Last Jedi, but it was ultimately not used.
 The Leisure Seeker (2017), released after Dick Gregory's death from heart failure.
 True to the Game (2017), and Roxanne Roxanne (2018), both released after Nelsan Ellis' death from alcohol withdrawal syndrome.
 Bad Grandmas (2017) released nearly a year after Florence Henderson's death from heart failure.
 The Tale (2018), Living Among Us (2018), and Imprisoned (2019), all released after John Heard's death from cardiac arrest due to atherosclerotic and hypertensive heart in July 2017.
 Frank & Ava (2018), released after Harry Dean Stanton's death.
 Hunter Killer (2018), Kursk (2018), and A Hidden Life (2019), all released after Michael Nyqvist's death from lung cancer in June 2017.
A Hidden Life was also released months after Bruno Ganz's death.
 Stan the Man (2018), released after Brad Bufanda's suicide.
 Engine Sentai Go-onger 10 Years Grand-Prix (2018), released after Daichi Nobe's (Go-on Green suit actor in the movie) death due to losing consciousness while rehearsing a stunt.
 The Queen of Hollywood Blvd (2018), and Pines (2022), both released after Michael Parks's death.
 The Other Side of the Wind (2018) released after the deaths of John Huston, Susan Strasberg, Lilli Palmer, Edmond O'Brien, Mercedes McCambridge, Paul Stewart, Tonio Selwart, Norman Foster, Benny Rubin, Dan Tobin, Richard Wilson, Claude Chabrol, Curtis Harrington and Paul Mazursky. Filming was completed in 1976.
 Harmony (2018), released ten months after Jessica Falkholt's death in a car accident alongside her family.
 Tyrel (2018; U.S. release), released nearly ten months after Reg E. Cathey's death from lung cancer.
 Spider-Man: Into the Spider-Verse (2018), Captain Marvel (2019), Avengers: Endgame (2019), and Madness in the Method (2019) all released after Stan Lee's death. 
 Lee makes an appearance in a mid-credits scene in Jay and Silent Bob Reboot (2019) through the use of archival footage of himself and Kevin Smith taken from San Diego Comic-Con.
 Spider-Man: Into the Spider-Verse also uses archival audio of Cliff Robertson from Spider-Man 2 (2004) for a flashback scene involving the character Uncle Ben. Robertson died seven years before the film was released.
The Delivery (2018; short film), Aliens, Clowns & Geeks (2019) and The 420 Movie (2020) all released after Verne Troyer's death from suicide from alcohol intoxication.
Zero (2018), released almost ten months after Sridevi's death from accidental drowning.
 An Innocent Kiss (2019) and Defining Moments (2020) released after Burt Reynolds's death from a heart attack in September 2018.
 Missing Link (2019), released less than two years after Jack Blessing's death from pancreatic cancer.
 Toy Story 4 (2019), released two years after Don Rickles' death from kidney failure. 
Pixar reviewed 25 years of archival material that Rickles had participated in, including unused lines from the first three films, video games, and other related media for the franchise, and other works, and repurposed them for use within the film.
 Bongee Bear and the Kingdom of Rhythm (2019), released a decade after Dom DeLuise's death from kidney failure in May 2009.
 Mewtwo Strikes Back: Evolution (2019), released in Japan nearly a year after Unshō Ishizuka's death from colon infection.
 Once Upon a Time in Hollywood (2019), released four months after Luke Perry's death from complications of a stroke.
 Astronaut (2019) released two months after Jennifer Phipps's death.
 Puppy Swap: Love Unleashed (2019), and Robber's Roost (TBA), both released after Margot Kidder's death from self-inflicted drug and alcohol overdose.
 Rolling Thunder Revue: A Bob Dylan Story by Martin Scorsese (2019), released two years after Sam Shepard's death from complications of amyotrophic lateral sclerosis.
 Descendants 3 (2019; television film) and Runt (2020), both released after Cameron Boyce's death from Sudden unexpected death in epilepsy.
 Viy 2: Journey to China (2019), Break (2020), Tonight at Noon (TBA) and Emperor (TBA), all released after Rutger Hauer's death.
 The Last Full Measure (2019), released two months after Peter Fonda's death from respiratory failure.
 Cleanin' Up the Town: Remembering Ghostbusters (2019) and Ghostbusters: Afterlife (2021) both released after Harold Ramis' death from autoimmune inflammatory vasculitis in February 2014.
 Cleanin' Up the Town: Remembering Ghostbusters uses the archive footage as himself, while Ghostbusters: Afterlife uses the archive footage as Dr. Egon Spengler from the first two films.

2020s

First Cow (2020) and Cortex (TBA) both released after René Auberjonois' death from lung cancer.
Dil Bechara (2020) released a month after Sushant Singh Rajput's death from suicide by hanging.
Bill & Ted Face the Music (2020), released twelve years after George Carlin's death. The film used archival footage of Carlin from the first film involving Rufus with Piotr Michael providing the character's voice.
Son of the South (2020) and Long Day Journey (TBA), both released after Brian Dennehy's death from cardiac arrest due to sepsis.
The Wolf of Snow Hollow (2020) and Grave Intentions (2021), both released after Robert Forster's death from brain cancer.
El Camino: A Breaking Bad Movie (2019), was also released the day of his death.
Borat Subsequent Moviefilm (2020) released after Holocaust survivor Judith Dim Evans' death.
Scoob! (2020) released 23 years after Don Messick's death; the film used archival recordings of Messick for Muttley's laugh.
Pokémon the Movie: Secrets of the Jungle (2020), released eight months after Keiji Fujiwara's death.
Ma Rainey's Black Bottom (2020) released nearly four months after Chadwick Boseman's death.
Boseman also appeared in Black Panther: Wakanda Forever (2022) through the use of repurposed footage from Black Panther (2018) during flashback scenes.
Black Panther: Wakanda Forever was also released a year after Dorothy Steel's death.
Hanukkah (2020), Suicide for Beginners (2022), and Abruptio (2023), all released after Sid Haig's death from aspergillus pneumonia in September 2019.
Calls (2021) released two and half months after V. J. Chitra's death. This was also her only motion picture performance.
To Olivia (2021) released three months after Geoffrey Palmer's death.
Senior Moment (2021) released two years after the deaths of Kaye Ballard and Denise DuBarry and one year after Jack Wallace's death.
Deported (2021) released after Conchata Farrell's death from complications of cardiac arrest.
The Confidence Man JP: The Movie 2 (2020), Tengaramon (2020), Brave: Gunjō Senki (2021) and Gift of Fire (2021) all released after Haruma Miura's death from suicide by hanging.
No Sudden Move (2021), The Scrapper (2021), Life After You (2022), and Bitcon (2022), all released after Craig Grant's death.
Batman: The Long Halloween, Part One and Batman: The Long Halloween, Part Two (2021; both direct-to-video) released both a year after the death of Naya Rivera from drowning.
Off the Rails (2021), released one year after Kelly Preston's death from breast cancer. 
Free Guy (2021) released nine months after Alex Trebek's death from pancreatic cancer.
The Last Letter from Your Lover (2021) and Prey for the Devil (2022) both released after Ben Cross's death from cancer in August 2020.
Charlotte (2021) released after Helen McCrory's death.
Last Night in Soho (2021) released a year after the deaths of Diana Rigg and Margaret Nolan. Rigg and Nolan died within a month of each other.
Straight Outta Nowhere: Scooby-Doo! Meets Courage the Cowardly Dog (2021, direct-to-video) released two months after Thea White's death.
Belfast (2021) released a year after the death of John Sessions.
Muppets Haunted Mansion (2021), Back Home Again (2021; short film), Captain Daddy (2021; TV film), Barking Mad (2021), Diary of a Wimpy Kid: Rodrick Rules (2022), Scarlett (TBA; television film), Awaken (TBA), Deadly Draw (TBA), The Gettysburg Address (TBA), A Fargo Christmas Story (TBA), and Unplugged (TBA), all to be released after Ed Asner's death from natural causes in August 2021.
 Back Home Again was also released two weeks after Norm Macdonald's death from acute leukemia.
 Captain Daddy was also released a year after Fred Willard's death from cardiac arrest.
Domino: Battle of the Bones (2021), Welcome to Our World (2021), Money Is King (2021), The Allnighter (2022) and Renegades (2022), all released after Tommy Lister Jr.’s death from hypertensive and atherosclerotic cardiovascular disease in December 2020.
High Holiday (2021) and Not to Forget (2021) both released months after Cloris Leachman's death.
 Not to Forget was also released over six months after Olympia Dukakis's death.
Echoes of the Past (2021) released a year after Max von Sydow's death.
Last Shoot Out (2021), Heart of the Gun (2021), and Shooting Star (2022), all released after Jay Pickett's death from a heart attack.
Don't Look Up (2021), and Spirited (2022), both released after truck driver Michael Gagnon's death in September 2021.
Murder at Teesri Manzil 302 (2021), released a year after Irrfan Khan's death from neuroendocrine cancer.
Betty White: A Celebration (2022; Docu-movie) released seventeen days after Betty White's death from a stroke.
The House (2022) released two years after Sven Wollter's death from complications of COVID-19.
Operation Mincemeat (2022) released nine months after Paul Ritter's death from heart failure and complications of brain cancer.
James (2022), and Lucky Man (2022), both released after Puneeth Rajkumar's death from cardiac arrest in October 2021.
Coma (2022) and More Than Ever (2022) released after Gaspard Ulliel's death from a skiing accident in January 2022, though Coma premiered at the Berlin Film Festival 24 days after his death.
The Valet (2022) was released after Carmen Salinas' death.
 Paws of Fury: The Legend of Hank and DC League of Super-Pets (2022) both released after Kirk Baily's death from heart failure and complications of lung cancer. He voices additional characters in both films.
 Without Ward (2022), released five years after Martin Landau's death from hypovolemic shock in July 2017.
 Respect the Jux (2022), and Super Athlete (TBA) both to be released after Tony Sirico's death.
 Breaking (2022), and Surrounded (2023) both to be released after Michael K. Williams's death from a drug overdose in September 2021.
 Girl in Room 13 (2022; television film), What Remains (2022), Frankie Meets Jack (2023), Supercell (2023), You're Killing Me (2023), Wildfire: The Legend of the Cherokee Ghost Horse (TBA), and Chasing Nightmares (TBA), all to be released after Anne Heche's death from brain damage in a car crash in August 2022.
 Triangle of Sadness (2022), had premiered on 21 May 2022 at Cannes Film Festival, but only went to the international release across countries from 1 to 2 months after Charlbi Dean's death due to bacterial sepsis in August 2022.
 Sidney (2022; Docu-movie) released eight months after Sidney Poitier's death from Cardiopulmonary, with Alzheimer's disease and lung cancer.
The Paloni Show! Halloween Special! (2022; TV special) released after Gilbert Gottfried's death from ventricular tachycardia, complicated by type II myotonic dystrophy.
 Daniel's Gotta Die (2022) released after Bob Saget's death in January 2022, though the film premiered at the Austin Film Festival nine months after his death.
 Glass Onion: A Knives Out Mystery (2022) released after the deaths of Stephen Sondheim in November 2021 and Angela Lansbury in October 2022. The film had appeared in film festivals a month before Lansbury's death, but only went into the wide theatrical and Netflix release following her death.
 Jung_E (2023), released eight months after Kang Soo-yeon's death due to complications of cerebral hemorrhage.
 Bond of Justice: Kizuna (2023), released a year after Sonny Chiba's death from COVID-19 complications.
 Cocaine Bear (2023), Fool’s Paradise (2023), The Substance (TBA), Dangerous Waters (TBA), and Clash (TBA) all to be released after Ray Liotta's death in May 2022.
 White Men Can't Jump (2023), Ballerina (TBA), Shirley (TBA) and The Caine Mutiny Court-Martial (TBA), all to be released after Lance Reddick's death in March 2023. John Wick: Chapter 4 (2023), had premiered earlier that month, but only went wide a week after Reddick's death.
 Legend of the White Dragon (2023), and Underdogs Rising (TBA) both to be released after Jason David Frank's death from suicide.
 Fast Charlie (TBA), to be released after James Caan's death from coronary artery disease.
The Ride (TBA), Pursued (TBA), and My Jurassic Place (TBA), all to be released after Paul Sorvino's death in July 2022.
 The Ray (TBA), to be released after Brad William Henke's death in November 2022.
First Time Female Director (TBA), to be released after Jak Knight's death from suicide by gunshot in July 2022.
Heroes of the Golden Masks (TBA), to be released after Christopher Plummer's death from complications from a fall.
Strangers in a Strange Land (TBA), to be released after Leslie Jordan’s death from a car crash in October 2022.
 Transmission: Vol 1 (TBA), The Intersection (TBA), and The Antagonist (TBA; short film), all to be released after Robert Cormier's death in September 2022.
 Slammer (TBA), to be released after Josephine Melville’s death in October 2022.
Relatively Super (TBA), to be released after Kevin Conroy's death from Intestinal cancer in November 2022.
 The Driver (TBA), and Eleanor's Bench (TBA; television film), both to be released after Clarence Gilyard's death in November 2022.
 3 Monkeys (TBA), to be released after Tunisha Sharma's death from suicide by hanging in December 2022.
 Stealing Vows (TBA), Eumenides Falls (TBA), and The Bounce (TBA; television film) all to be released after Pedro Miguel Arce's death in December 2022.
 Do You Want to Die in Indio? (TBA), to be released after Cody Longo’s death in February 2023.
 Aaah! Roach! (TBA), American Game (TBA), Horse (TBA) and Justice Angel (TBA) all to be released after Jansen Panettiere’s death from cardiomegaly in February 2023.

See also
Unfinished work
List of works published posthumously

References

Lists of films
Films